Mexican Americans are residents of the United States who are of Mexican descent. The list includes Mexican immigrants and those who lived in the southwestern United States when the territory was incorporated in 1848.

Sports

American football

 Louie Aguiar – NFL punter
 Joe Aguirre – NFL tight end
 Roberto Aguayo – NFL and NCAA Division I placekicker at Florida State University
 Leo Araguz – NFL kicker and punter
 Joe Arenas – NFL running back, safety, punt returner and kick returner
 Gene Brito – defensive end, 1955 NFL player of the year
 Anthony Calvillo – CFL quarterback
 Greg Camarillo – NFL wide receiver
 Joe Cardona – NFL long snapper
 Tony Casillas – NFL defensive lineman
 Sergio Castillo – NFL kicker and punter
 Jorge Cordova – NFL linebacker
 Frank Corral – NFL placekicker
 Ronnie Cruz – NFL fullback
 Michael Davis – NFL defensive back
 Brian de la Puente – NFL center
 Donnie Edwards – NFL linebacker
 Tom Fears – NFL wide receiver and head coach, member of Pro Football Hall of Fame
 Manny Fernandez – NFL defensive tackle
 Tom Flores – one of two individuals in NFL history to win a Super Bowl as a player, assistant coach and head coach.
 Arian Foster – NFL running back
 Aaron Garcia – college and Arena Football quarterback
 Jeff Garcia – NFL quarterback
 Max Garcia – NFL guard
 Norberto Garrido – NFL offensive lineman
 Roberto Garza – NFL offensive guard
 Zane Gonzalez – NFL placekicker
 Brock Gutierrez – NFL offensive lineman
 Joe Hernandez – NFL wide receiver
 Will Hernandez – NFL guard
 Efren Herrera – NFL placekicker
 Ziggy Hood – NFL defensive end
 David Diaz-Infante – NFL guard and center
 Matt Kalil – NFL offensive tackle
 Ryan Kalil – NFL center
 Joe Kapp – NFL quarterback
 J. P. Losman – NFL quarterback
 Blake Martinez – NFL inside linebacker
 Max Montoya – NFL
 Matt Moore – NFL quarterback
 Moses Moreno – NFL quarterback
 Zeke Moreno – NFL linebacker
 Anthony Muñoz – Hall of Fame NFL offensive tackle
 Ricky Ortiz – NFL
 Luis Perez – NCAA quarterback
 Mike Perez – NFL quarterback
 Jim Plunkett – NFL quarterback
 Jose Portilla – NFL offensive tackle
 Manny Ramirez – NFL offensive lineman
 Aldo Richins – NFL wingback
 Ron Rivera – NFL linebacker and coach
 Pete Rodriguez – NFL special teams coach
 Ruben Rodriguez – NFL punter
 Tony Romo – NFL quarterback
 Juan Roque – NFL offensive tackle
 Aldrick Rosas – NFL placekicker
 Eddie Saenz – NFL running back
 Mark Sanchez – NFL quarterback
 Rigoberto Sanchez – NFL punter
 Zack Sanchez – NFL cornerback
 Andrew Sendejo – NFL strong safety
 Rafael Septién – NFL placekicker
 Daniel Sepulveda – NFL punter
 Louis Vasquez – NFL offensive lineman
 Danny Villa – NFL guard
 Danny Villanueva – NFL punter/place kicker
 Tony Zendejas – NFL placekicker

Baseball

 Mike Adams – MLB pitcher
 Hank Aguirre – MLB all-star pitcher
 Mike Aldrete – MLB First Baseman and Outfielder
 Mel Almada – MLB outfielder
 Armando Almanza – MLB pitcher
 Abe Alvarez – MLB pitcher
 Héctor Ambriz – MLB pitcher
 Rubén Amaro Jr. – MLB outfielder
 Bob Apodaca – MLB pitcher and coach
 Frank Arellanes – MLB pitcher
 Fernando Arroyo – MLB pitcher
 Rod Barajas – MLB catcher
 Cuno Barragan – MLB catcher
 Freddie Benavides – MLB infielder
 Quintin Berry – MLB outfielder and pinch runner
 Matt Bush – MLB pitcher
 Jorge Cantú – MLB infielder
 Cam Carreon – MLB catcher
 Mark Carreon – MLB first baseman
 Cisco Carlos – MLB pitcher
 Jason Castro – MLB catcher
 Cesar Carrillo – MLB pitcher
 Bobby Castillo – MLB pitcher
 Frank Castillo – MLB starting pitcher
 Marty Castillo – MLB catcher and third baseman
 Jaime Cerda – MLB pitcher
 Eric Chavez – MLB third baseman
 Jesse Chavez – MLB pitcher
 Matt Chico – MLB pitcher
 Chad Cordero – MLB relief pitcher
 Pat Corrales – MLB catcher and coach
 Dan Cortes – MLB pitcher
 Jacob Cruz – MLB outfielder
 Bobby Cuellar – MLB pitcher and coach
 Khris Davis – MLB outfielder
 Chris Dominguez – MLB infielder
 Matt Dominguez – MLB infielder
 Chuck Estrada – MLB pitcher
 Johnny Estrada – MLB catcher
 Marco Estrada – MLB pitcher
 Fernando Cortez – MLB infielder
 Danny Espinosa – MLB infielder
 Andre Ethier – MLB outfielder
 Phillip Evans – MLB Infielder
 Carlos Fisher – MLB pitcher
 Jesse Flores – MLB pitcher
 Randy Flores – MLB pitcher
 Ron Flores – MLB pitcher
 Brian Fuentes – MLB all-star relief pitcher
 Yovani Gallardo – MLB pitcher
 Mike Gallego – MLB outfielder and coach
 Greg Garcia – MLB infielder
 Kiko Garcia – MLB infielder
 Mike Garcia – MLB all-star pitcher
 Nomar Garciaparra – MLB all-star shortstop
 Matt Garza – MLB pitcher
 Eddie Gamboa – MLB pitcher
 Chris Gomez – MLB infielder
 Luis Gómez – MLB infielder
 Adrián González – MLB first baseman
 Edgar Gonzalez – MLB infielder
 Michael Gonzalez – MLB closer/pitcher
 Bob Greenwood – MLB pitcher
 Eddie Guardado – MLB all-star pitcher
 Javy Guerra – MLB closer/pitcher
 Carlos Guevara – MLB pitcher
 Jerry Hairston Jr. – MLB Infielder 
 Scott Hairston – MLB outfielder
 Dan Haren – MLB all-star pitcher
 Gil Heredia – MLB spot starting pitcher
 David Hernandez – MLB starting pitcher
 Jeremy Hernandez – MLB pitcher
 Daniel Herrera – MLB relief pitcher
 Rudy Jaramillo – Hitting coach
 Jason Jaramillo – MLB catcher
 Jason Jiménez – MLB pitcher
 Joe Kelly – MLB pitcher
 Brandon Laird – MLB Third baseman
 Gerald Laird – MLB catcher
 Adam LaRoche – MLB first baseman
 Andy LaRoche – MLB infielder
 Dave LaRoche – MLB pitcher
 Eddie Leon – MLB infielder
 Nick Leyva – MLB manager
 Evan Longoria – MLB all-star infielder, 2008 rookie of the year
 Albie Lopez – MLB pitcher
 Rafael Martin – MLB relief pitcher
 Buck Martinez – MLB manager, catcher and commentator
 Alfonso Márquez – MLB Umpire
 Alex Mejia – MLB infielder
 Sergio Mitre – MLB pitcher
 Sid Monge – MLB all-star relief pitcher
 Carlos Muñiz – MLB relief pitcher
 Sandy Nava – MLB infielder
 Efren Navarro – MLB first baseman
 Vidal Nuño – MLB pitcher
 Ricky Nolasco – MLB pitcher
 Edgar Olmos – MLB pitcher
 Augie Ojeda – MLB infielder
 Steve Ontiveros – MLB infielder
 Jesse Orosco – MLB all-star pitcher
 Jorge Orta – MLB all-star second baseman
 Russ Ortiz – MLB pitcher
 Jordan Pacheco – MLB infielder/catcher
 Manny Parra – MLB pitcher
 James Pazos – MLB pitcher
 Marty Perez - Shortstop and baseman  
 Óliver Pérez – MLB pitcher
 Chris Prieto – MLB outfielder
 Carlos Quentin – MLB all-star outfielder
 Omar Quintanilla – MLB shortstop
 Erasmo Ramirez – MLB relief pitcher
 Horacio Ramírez – MLB pitcher
 Noe Ramirez – MLB pitcher
 A.J. Ramos – MLB closer pitcher
 Cesar Ramos – MLB relief pitcher
 Rudy Regalado – MLB infielder
 Rick Renteria – MLB infielder and coach
 Anthony Rendon – MLB infielder
 Anthony Reyes – MLB pitcher
 Jo-Jo Reyes – MLB pitcher
 Fernando Rodriguez – MLB pitcher
 Rich Rodriguez – MLB pitcher
 JoJo Romero – MLB pitcher
 Stefen Romero – MLB Outfielder
 Ricky Romero – MLB starting pitcher
 Sergio Romo – MLB pitcher
 Rio Ruiz – MLB infielder
 Adam Rosales – MLB infielder
 Leo Rosales – MLB relief pitcher
 Mark Salas – MLB catcher
 Jeff Salazar – MLB outfielder
 Alex Sanabia – MLB pitcher
 Aaron Sanchez – MLB pitcher
 Freddy Sanchez – MLB all-star infielder and batting champion
 Sergio Santos – MLB relief pitcher
 Rudy Seánez – MLB pitcher
 José Silva – MLB pitcher
 Tyler Skaggs – MLB pitcher
 Frank Snyder – MLB pitcher
 Carlos Torres – MLB relief pitcher
 Mike Torrez – MLB pitcher
 Jason Vargas – MLB pitcher
 Fernando Valenzuela – MLB pitcher
 Anthony Vasquez – MLB pitcher
 Randy Velarde – MLB infielder
 Gil Velazquez – MLB infielder
 Vince Velasquez – MLB pitcher
 Alex Verdugo – MLB outfielder
 Ryan Verdugo – MLB pitcher
 Pedro Villarreal – MLB pitcher
 Fernando Viña – MLB all-star second baseman
 Taijuan Walker – MLB pitcher
 Ted Williams – MLB left fielder and Hall of Fame legend
 Michael Young – MLB all-star MVP, shortstop and batting champion
 Joel Zumaya – MLB pitcher

Basketball

 Mark Aguirre – USBWA college basketball player of the year, 3-time NBA all-star, and 2-time NBA champion
 Jack Avina – college coach
 Devin Booker – guard
 James Borrego – NBA coach
 Kaleb Canales – NBA coach
 Cedric Ceballos – forward
 Rene Herrerias – college coach
 Lorenzo Mata – center
 Elijah Millsap – forward
 Anthony Pedroza – guard
 Paul Stoll – guard
 Juan Toscano-Anderson – forward
 Orlando Méndez-Valdez – guard
 Earl Watson – guard

Boxing

 Oscar Albarado – light middleweight champion
 Art Aragon – lightweight boxer
 Baby Arizmendi – title holder, Hall of Famer
 Chris Arreola – heavyweight boxer
 Paulie Ayala – WBA bantamweight champion
 Tony Ayala Jr. – junior middleweight boxer
 Carlos Balderas – professional boxer
 Tony Baltazar – professional boxer
 Arnold Barboza Jr. – professional boxer
 David Benavidez – WBC super middleweight champion
 José Benavidez Jr. – WBA interim light welterweight champion
 Norberto Bravo – professional boxer
 Gaby Canizales – bantamweight world champion boxer
 Orlando Canizales – bantamweight world champion boxer, Hall of Famer
 Michael Carbajal – four-time light flyweight champion boxer, Hall of Famer
 Ruben Castillo – professional boxer
 Bobby Chacon – two-time champion boxer, Hall of Famer
 Jesús Chávez – two division world champion
 Jackie Chavez – female boxer and IFBA World super bantamweight champion
 Rudy Cisneros – boxer, Contender contestant
 Diego Corrales – super featherweight and lightweight champion
 Steve Cruz – featherweight champion
 Alberto Dávila – bantamweight champion
 Oscar De La Hoya – ten-time world champion, Hall of Famer
 David Díaz – WBC lightweight champion
 Joseph Diaz – IBF super featherweight champion
 Juan Díaz – WBA and WBO and IBF World lightweight champion
 Marlen Esparza – 2012 women's boxing bronze medalist
 Louie Espinoza – WBA featherweight champion
 Brandon Figueroa – WBC super bantamweight champion
 Omar Figueroa Jr. – WBC lightweight champion
 Alexander Flores – professional boxer
 B. J. Flores – professional boxer
 Joshua Franco – WBA super flyweight champion
 Arturo Frias – world champion
 Alex García – heavyweight boxer
 Roberto Garcia – IBF super featherweight champion
 Ryan Garcia – professional boxer
 Miguel Ángel García – featherweight, super featherweight and lightweight champion, brother of Roberto Garcia
 Jaime Garza – WBC Super Bantamweight
 Loreto Garza – world champion light welterweight
 Frankie Gómez – lightweight prospect
 Jaime Manuel Gómez – Mexican-American professional boxer in the Light Middleweight division
 Delia Gonzalez – flyweight female boxer
 Jesús González – an amateur champion and Super middleweight contender
 Paul Gonzales – flyweight Olympic gold medalist
 Rodolfo Gonzales – boxer, poet, and leader of the Chicano civil rights movement
 Robert Guerrero – IBF featherweight and super featherweight champion
 Genaro Hernández – WBA and WBC super featherweight champion, Hall of famer
 Jesse James Leija – world champion boxer
 Don Jordan – world welterweight champion
 Willie Jorrín – WBC super bantamweight champion
 Rocky Juarez – Olympic silver medalist
Brandun Lee – professional boxer
 Richie Lemos – professional boxer
 Carlos Licona – professional boxer
 Danny Lopez – world featherweight champion, Hall of Famer
 Josesito López – professional boxer
 Tony Lopez – three-time world champion
 Steven Luevano –  WBO featherweight champion
 Jesse Magdaleno – WBO super bantamweight champion
 Raúl Márquez – world champion boxer and boxing announcer
 Abner Mares – bantamweight, super bantamweight and featherweight champion
 Antonio Margarito – WBO welterweight champion
 Sergio Mora – WBC super welterweight world champion
 Manuel Ortiz – world bantamweight champion, Hall of Famer
 Victor Ortiz – WBC welterweight champion
 Vergil Ortiz Jr. – professional boxer
 Bobby Pacho – professional boxer
 Zack Padilla – light welterweight champion
 Robert Quiroga – IBF superflyweight champion
 José Ramírez – WBC and WBO light welterweight champion
 Mando Ramos – lightweight champion
 Daniel Roman – WBA super bantamweight champion
 Andy Ruiz Jr. –  WBA (Super), IBF, WBO and IBO heavyweight champion
 Danny Romero – world champion boxer
 Brandon Ríos – WBA lightweight champion
 David Rodriguez – undefeated heavyweight boxer
 Raul Rojas – WBA featherweight champion
 Joseph Salas – featherweight Olympic silver medalist
 Martha Salazar – WBC heavyweight boxing champion
 Abel Sanchez – professional boxing trainer
 Richie Sandoval – bantamweight champion
 Alex Saucedo – professional boxer
 Maureen Shea – professional boxer, known as the "Real Million Dollar Baby"
 Solly Smith – first Latino featherweight champion of the world 
 Mia St. John – WBC champion, professional female boxer
 Johnny Tapia – five-time flyweight, bantamweight and featherweight champion, Hall of famer
 Jesse Valdez – Olympic bronze medalist (1972)
 Fernando Vargas – two-time light middleweight champion
 Jessie Vargas – WBA super lightweight and WBO welterweight champion
 Jose Zepeda – professional boxer

Football (soccer)

 Jackie Acevedo – striker
 Isaac Acuña – midfielder
 Emily Alvarado – goalkeeper
 Mónica Alvarado – defender, international footballer
 Ventura Alvarado – defender
 Alejandro Alvarado Jr. – midfielder
 Efraín Álvarez – midfielder
 Carlos Alvarez – midfielder
 Frankie Amaya – midfielder
 Daniel Antúnez – midfielder
 Fernando Arce Jr. – midfielder
 Julian Araujo – defender
 Esteban Arias – defender
 Eder Arreola – midfielder
 Luis Arriaga – midfielder
 Paul Arriola – midfielder
 Eric Avila – midfielder
 Carlos Avilez – goalkeeper
 Ivan Becerra – forward
 Julio Benitez – midfielder
 Carlos Bocanegra – center back and captain of the US National Team
 Carlos Borja – defender
 Jonathan Bornstein – defender and midfielder
 Jose Burciaga Jr. – defender
 Christina Burkenroad – forward
 Ariana Calderón – striker
 Javier Casas – midfielder
 Edgar Castillo – defender
 Bri Campos – defender
 Servando Carrasco – midfielder
 Edwin Cerrillo – midfielder
 Alfonso Ocampo-Chavez – forward
 Julian Chavez – midfielder
 Joe Corona – midfielder
 Antonietta Collins – sports commentator and soccer player, daughter of the well-known television reporter María Antonieta Collins
 Chris Cortez – forward
 Ramiro Corrales – midfielder
 Cade Cowell – forward
 Stephanie Cox – defender, Olympic gold medalist
 Renae Cuéllar – forward
 Daniel Cuevas – winger
 Mauricio Cuevas – defender
 A. J. DeLaGarza – defender
 Marco Delgado – midfielder
 Erik Dueñas – defender
 David Estrada – defender
 Marco Farfan – defender
 Janelly Farias – defender
 Omir Fernandez – attacking midfielder
 Vidal Fernandez – midfielder
 Dennis Flores – midfielder
 Monica Flores – leftback
 Jaime Frías – defender
 Joe Gallardo – forward
 Christopher Garcia – forward
 Freddie Garcia – forward
 Irving Garcia – midfielder
 Natalie Garcia – defender
 Nick Garcia – defender
 Poli Garcia – midfielder
 Rafael Garcia – midfielder
 Alina Garciamendez – defender
 Greg Garza – defender
 Monica Gerardo – coach and former player
 Luis Gil – midfielder
 Alejandro Guido – attacking midfielder
 Elizabeth Gómez – defender
 Francisco Gomez – midfielder
 Herculez Gomez – forward
 Johan Gomez – forward
 Jonathan Gómez – defender
 Daniel Gonzalez – midfielder
 Jesse González – goalkeeper
 Jonathan Gonzalez – midfielder
 Miguel Gonzalez – midfielder
 Mónica Gonzalez – forward
 Omar Gonzalez – defender
 Antonio De La Torre – defender
 Luis Gil – midfielder
 Sonny Guadarrama – midfielder
 Anisa Guajardo – striker
 Brian Gutiérrez – midfielder
 Diego Gutiérrez – forward 
 Nancy Gutiérrez – defender
 Bianca Henninger – goalkeeper
 Alonso Hernández – attacking midfielder
 Daniel Hernández – defender
 Jorge Hernandez – midfielder
 Laurie Hill – midfielder
 Sofia Huerta – forward
 Miguel Ibarra – midfielder
 Rafael Jauregui – midfielder
 Hector Jiménez – defender
 Benji Joya – midfielder
 Freddy Juarez – defender
 Kiki Lara – midfielder, coach
 Richard Ledezma – midfielder
 Danny Leyva – midfielder
 Ulysses Llanez – forward
 Aaron Lopez – defender
 Mikey Lopez – midfielder
 Rodrigo López – midfielder
 Christian Lucatero – midfielder
 Diego Luna – midfielder
 Richie Marquez – defender
 Alma Martínez – defender
 Antonio Martínez – midfielder
 John Matkin – midfielder
 Annia Mejia – defender
 Alex Mendez – midfielder
 Ruben Mendoza – forward
 Martha Moore – defender
 Susana Mora – defender
 Julio César Morales – forward
 Amando Moreno – forward
 Mike Muñoz – midfielder
 Santiago Muñóz – forward
 Christina Murillo – defender
 Lisa Nanez – forward
 Teresa Noyola – attacking midfielder, international player
 Ernest Nungaray – forward
 Juan Pablo Ocegueda – left back
 Gina Oceguera – defender
 David Ochoa – goalkeeper
 Emmanuel Ochoa – goalkeeper
 Sammy Ochoa – forward
 Nathan Ordaz – forward
 Emilio Orozco – defender
 Michael Orozco Fiscal – defender
 Rey Ortiz – forward
 Jesús Padilla – forward, striker
 Miguel Palafox – defender
 Amanda Perez – midfielder
 Ricardo Pepi – forward
 Jonathan Perez – attacking midfielder
 Orlando Perez – defender
 Veronica Perez – forward
 Bruno Piceno – striker
 Mauricio Pineda – defender
 Miguel Ángel Ponce – defender, Olympic gold medalist
 Linnea Quinones – goalkeeper
 Nick Rimando – goalkeeper
 Allan Rodríguez – midfielder
 Mario Rodriguez – forward
 Memo Rodríguez – midfielder
 Arianna Romero – defender
 César Romero – forward
 Rubio Rubin – forward
 Adrián Ruelas – striker
 Jennifer Ruiz – midfielder, defender
 Katie Johnson – forward, international footballer
 Jorge Salcedo – defender
 Hugo Salcedo – forward, coach
 Omar Salgado – forward and midfielder
 Shea Salinas – winger
 Tanya Samarzich – forward
 Ashley Sanchez – forward
 Keri Sanchez – defender, coach
 Maria Sánchez – midfielder
 Richard Sánchez – goalkeeper
 Marlene Sandoval – defender
 Sebastian Saucedo – midfielder
 Bianca Sierra – defender, international footballer
 Luis Silva – midfielder
 Sebastian Soto – forward
 Jonathan Top – forward
 Antonio de la Torre – midfielder
 Arturo Torres – defender
 Christian Torres – forward
 José Francisco Torres – midfielder
 Dioselina Valderrama – midfielder
 Obed Vargas – midfielder
 Jose Vasquez – defender
 Julián Vázquez – forward
 Martin Vasquez – midfielder and head coach
 Brandon Vazquez – forward
 Jesús Antonio Vázquez – left back
 Marco Vidal – midfielder
 Jaime Villarreal – midfielder
 Jorge Villafaña – defender
 Jose Villarreal – forward
 Natalie Vinti – defender
 William Yarbrough – goalkeeper
 Carlos Zavala – midfielder
 Adrian Zendejas – goalkeeper
 Alejandro Zendejas – midfielder 
 Veronica Zepeda – forward

Golf

 Abraham Ancer – professional golfer
 Alex Aragon – professional golfer
 Homero Blancas – PGA tour winner
 Sam Chavez – professional golfer
 Abe Espinosa – first Hispanic-American to win a championship
 Al Espinosa – PGA tour winner
 Armando Favela – professional golfer
 Robert Gamez – PGA tour winner
 Ernie Gonzalez – PGA tour winner
 Tony Holguin – PGA tour winner
 Joe Jimenez – PGA Senior's champion
 Pat Perez – PGA tour winner
 Nancy Lopez – Hall of Fame American professional golfer
 Lizette Salas – LPGA tour winner
 J. J. Spaun – PGA tour winner
 Lee Trevino – Hall of Fame American professional golfer

Ice hockey

 Scott Gomez – NHL center
 Max Pacioretty – NHL left wing
 Auston Matthews – NHL center
 Matthew Nieto – NHL left wing
 Rhett Rakhshani – NHL right wing

Martial arts

 Joseph Benavidez – UFC, mixed martial arts
 Eddie Bravo – mixed martial arts, Brazilian jiu-jitsu
 Paul Buentello – UFC, mixed martial arts
 Graciela Casillas – kickboxing and boxing title holder, martial arts practitioner
 Henry Cejudo – UFC champion, mixed martial arts
 Carlos Condit – UFC champion, mixed martial arts
 Dominick Cruz – UFC champion, mixed martial arts
 Nate Diaz – UFC, mixed martial arts TUF Winner
 Nick Diaz – UFC, mixed martial arts
 Efrain Escudero – mixed martial arts TUF Winner
 Carla Esparza – UFC champion, mixed martial arts
 Tony Ferguson – mixed martial arts TUF Winner
 Kelvin Gastelum – mixed martial arts TUF Winner
 Edgar Garcia – UFC, mixed martial arts
 Anthony Hernandez – UFC, mixed martial arts
 Roger Huerta – Bellator, mixed martial arts
 Juanito Ibarra – mixed martial arts and boxing trainer
 Ricardo Lamas – mixed martial arts
 Rob McCullough – Muay Thai kickboxing, mixed martial arts
 Gilbert Melendez – Strikeforce champion, UFC mixed martial arts
 Brian Ortega – UFC, mixed martial arts
 Tito Ortiz – UFC champion, mixed martial arts
 Damacio Page – UFC, mixed martial arts
 Julianna Peña – UFC, mixed martial arts
 Alex Perez – UFC, mixed martial arts
 Anthony Pettis – UFC champion, mixed martial arts
 Sergio Pettis – UFC, mixed martial arts
 Dominick Reyes – UFC, mixed martial arts
 Ricco Rodriguez – UFC champion, mixed martial arts
 Mia St. John – tae kwon do champion
 Diego Sanchez – UFC, mixed martial arts TUF 1 Winner
 Emmanuel Sanchez – Bellator, mixed martial arts
 Frank Shamrock – UFC champion, mixed martial arts
 Joe Soto – Bellator champion, UFC mixed martial arts
 Jeremy Stephens – UFC, mixed martial arts
 Joe Stevenson – UFC, mixed martial arts
 Cub Swanson – UFC, mixed martial arts
 Manny Tapia – mixed martial arts
 Josh Thomson – Strikeforce champion, UFC mixed martial arts
 Miguel Torres – WEC champion, UFC mixed martial arts
 Charlie Valencia – mixed martial arts
 Cain Velasquez – UFC heavyweight champion, mixed martial arts
 Joey Villasenor – mixed martial arts

Wrestling

 Aaron Aguilera – professional wrestler
 The Bella Twins – professional wrestlers
 Bayley – professional wrestler
 Sin Cara – professional wrestler
 Manny Fernandez – professional wrestler
 Pepper Gomez – professional wrestler
 Chavo Guerrero Sr. – professional wrestler
 Chavo Guerrero Jr. – professional wrestler
 Eddie Guerrero – professional wrestler
 Gory Guerrero – professional wrestler
 Hector Guerrero – professional wrestler
 Mando Guerrero – professional wrestler
 Gino Hernandez – professional wrestler
 Shawn Hernandez – professional wrestler
 Incognito – professional wrestler
 Kaitlyn – professional wrestler
 Kalisto – professional wrestler
 Paul London – professional wrestler
 Eva Marie – professional wrestler
 Dominik Mysterio - profesional wrestler 
 Rey Mysterio Jr – professional wrestler
 Magno – professional wrestler
 Shelly Martinez – professional wrestler
 Misterioso – professional wrestler
 JoJo Offerman – professional wrestler
 Melina Perez – professional wrestler
 Johnny Rodz – professional wrestler
 Ricky Romero – professional wrestler
 Tito Santana – professional wrestler
 José Luis Jair Soria – professional wrestler
 Enrique Torres – professional wrestler
 Lady Victoria – professional wrestler
 Chris Youngblood – professional wrestler
 Jay Youngblood – professional wrestler

Other sports

 David Aldana – professional motorcycle racer
 Tony Alva – professional skateboarder, founding member of the Z-Boys.
 Anita Alvarez – Olympic synchronized swimmer
 Olga Appell – Olympic Track and Field Athlete, winner of the LA Marathon
 Inaki Basauri – rugby union player, member the U.S. national team
 Crystl Bustos – softball player, two-time Olympic Gold and silver medalist
 Steve Caballero – professional skateboarder, pioneer of vertical skating
 Miguel de Capriles – fencer, two time Olympic medalist, and President of the FIE
 Patricia Cardenas – world champion water polo gold medalist
 Henry Cejudo – freestyle wrestler and Olympic gold medalist
 Michael Chacon – professional fixed gear freestyle bike rider
 Antonio Cruz – cyclist, US National Criterium Champion
 Ronnie Deleon – two-time World kickboxing champion
 Erica Dittmer – swimmer
 Ernesto Escobedo – tennis player
 David R. Flores – jockey
 Gary Gabelich – motorsport driver, set the Land Speed Record
 Rudy Galindo – figure skater, U.S. National champion
 Jackie Galloway – taekwondo competitor, Olympic medalist
 Martin Garcia – jockey
 Angélica Gavaldón – tennis player
 Memo Gidley – race car driver
 Mark Gonzales – skateboarder, named by the Transworld Skateboarding magazine as the "Most Influential Skateboarder of all Time"
 Pancho Gonzales – professional tennis player, regarded as one of the greatest of all-time.
 Carlos Gracida – polo player, hall of fame member
 Guillermo Gracida Jr. – polo player, hall of fame member
 Jesus Hernandez – race car driver
 Danny Herrera – weightlifting powerlifter
 Jessa Khan –  ju-jitsu practitioner, international gold medalist
 Ricardo Laguna – professional BMX rider and television personality
 Arlene Limas – taekwondo, Olympic gold medalist
 Andy Lopez – college baseball coach
 Rob Machado – surfer
 Leonel Manzano – middle-distance runner, Olympic silver medalist
 Bobby Martinez – professional surfer
 Brenda Martinez – track and field athlete
 Mario Martinez – weightlifting powerlifter Olympic silver medalist (1984)
 Rachel McLish – bodybuilder, first Ms. Olympia champion
 Marten Mendez – badminton player, U.S national title winner
 Jessica Mendoza – softball player and Olympic Gold and silver medalist
 Marc Frank Montoya – professional snowboarder
 Juan Moreno – taekwondo, two-time Olympic silver medalist
 Sylvia Mosqueda – long-distance runner
 Justine Wong-Orantes – volleyball player, Olympic gold medalist
 Derek Parra – professional speed skater and Olympic gold medalist
 Kevin Peraza – BMX freestyle rider, two-time X Games gold medalist
 Cruz Pedregon – two-time drag racing champion
 Tony Pedregon – two-time drag racing champion
 Tori Pena – pole vaulter
 Stacy Peralta – professional skateboarder, founding member of the Z-Boys.
 Sarah Robles – weightlifter, Olympic medalist
 Paul Rodriguez Jr. – professional skateboarder
 Rico Roman – ice sledge hockey player, Paralympics gold medalist and Purple Heart recipient
 Gene Romero – professional motorcycle racer, winner of the 1970 A.M.A. Grand National Championship and the 1975 Daytona 200
 Leo Romero – professional skateboarder
 Sierra Romero – softball player, first player to record 300 runs, 300 hits and 300 RBI in NCAA history
 Jesse Ruíz – wrestler
 Oz Sanchez – handcyclist and triathlete, six-time Paralympic Games medalist
 Cristian Soratos – middle-distance runner
 Tracee Talavera – gymnast, Olympic silver medalist
 Jorge Torres – long-distance runner
 Vanessa Torres – professional skateboarder
 Tony Trujillo – professional skateboarder
 Benny Urquidez – World kickboxing champion
 Ismael Valenzuela – Kentucky Derby winner
 Patrick Valenzuela – Kentucky Derby and Preakness Stakes winner
 Brenda Villa – World Class water polo player, Olympic gold, silver and bronze medalist

Arts and entertainment

Actors and media personalities

 Rodolfo Acosta (1920–1974) Mexican character actor of Western films
 Rico Alaniz (1919–2015) character actor, active during the 1950s and 1990s.
 Jessica Alba (born 1981) Golden Globe nominated actress (father of Mexican descent)
 Edward Albert (1951–2006) Golden Globe winning actor
 Kevin Alejandro (born 1976) actor
 Ana Alicia (born 1956) actress
 Francia Almendárez (born 1988) actress
 Don Alvarado (1900–1967) actor and director who began his career during the silent film era
 Armida (1911–1989) actress, singer and dancer
 Joe Arquette (born 1981) actor
 Alexis Ayala (born 1965) actor
 Catherine Bach (born 1954) actress (mother of Mexican descent)
 Jaylen Barron (born 1997) actress
 Alma Beltran (1919–2007) actress, appeared in 82 films between 1945 and 2002.
 Robert Beltran (born 1953) actor
 Demián Bichir (born 1963) actor
 Summer Bishil (born 1988) actress
 Alexis Bledel (born 1981) actress
 Daniela Bobadilla (born 1993) actress
 Diego Boneta (born 1990) actor
 Jesse Borrego (born 1962) actor
 Sabrina Bryan (born 1984) dancer, choreographer, actress and singer
 Shelbie Bruce (born 1992) actress (mother of Mexican descent)
 Artt Butler (born 1969) voice actor (half Mexican)
 Richard Cabral (born 1984) Emmy nominated actor
 Christian Camargo (born 1971) actor
 Ralph Camargo (1912–1992) actor
 Charlie Cannon (1911–2003) singer, theater performer
 Steve Cardenas (born 1974) actor
 Leo Carrillo (1881–1961) actor, vaudevillian, political cartoonist and conservationist.
 Enrique Castillo (born 1949) actor
 Lynda Carter (born 1951) actress and singer best known as the title character in popular 1970s television series Wonder Woman (mother of Mexican and Spanish descent)
 David Castañeda (born 1988), actor
 Movita Castaneda (1916–2015) actress
 Teresa Castillo (born 1983) actress
 Julio Cedillo (born 1970) actor
 Angélica Celaya (born 1982) actress
 Laura Cerón (born 1964) ALMA Award-winning actress
 Damian Chapa (born 1963) actor, film director and producer
 Ricardo Antonio Chavira (born 1971) actor
 Louis C.K. (born 1967) actor, comedian, Emmy Award-winning screenwriter, producer, and director (Mexican father)
 Gary Clarke (born 1933) TV actor active during the 1950s–1960s
 Steve Clemente (1885–1950) Mexican-born American actor known for his many villainous roles
 Clifton Collins Jr. (born 1970) Emmy Award nominated actor (mother of Mexican descent)
 Mark Consuelos (born 1971) actor
 Ana Brenda Contreras (born 1986) Mexican based television actress
 Margarita Cordova (born 1939) actress, most known for her various TV appearances during the '60s
 Raymond Cruz (born 1961) actor
 Kid Cudi (born 1984) musician and actor (father was of partial Mexican descent)
 Ethan Cutkosky (born 1999) actor
 Alana de la Garza (born 1976) actress
 Madison De La Garza (born 2001) American actress of Mexican descent (Desperate Housewives)
 Gonzalo de la Torre (born 1977) singer and producer
 Kate del Castillo Mexican-born American actress (Muchachitas, Alguna vez tendremos alas, La Mentira, Ramona, Bajo la misma piel).
 Stacey Dash (born 1967) actress
 Emilio Delgado (born 1940) actor; best known for his role of Luis Rodriguez on Sesame Street
 Grey DeLisle (born 1973) singer-songwriter and voice actress
 Alexa Demie (born 1990) actress (mother is Mexican)
 Rosanna DeSoto (born 1950) film and television actress
 Aarón Díaz (born 1982) actor (father of Mexican descent)
 Alyssa Diaz (born 1985) actress
 Mónica Dionne American actress of Mexican descent
 Julia Louis-Dreyfus (born 1961) multiple Emmy award-winning actress (grandmother of Mexican and German-Brazilian ancestry)
 Alejandro Edda (born 1984) actor
 Ayiiia Elizarraras TV personality and model
 Jade Esteban Estrada (born 1975) actor and comedian
 Felipe Esparza (born 1976) actor and comedian
 Tamara Feldman (born 1980) actress
 Abel Fernandez (1930–2016) American actor who played in movies from 1953 to 2002.
 Michelle Forbes (born 1965) Emmy nominated and Saturn Award-winning actress
 Eduardo Franco
 Edward Furlong (born 1977) Saturn Award-winning actor (mother of Mexican descent)
 Vic Fuentes (born 1983) vocalist, guitarist
 Mike Fuentes (born 1984) drummer
 Edy Ganem (born 1983) actress
 Seychelle Gabriel (born 1991) singer and actress, father of part Mexican descent
 Aimee Garcia (born 1978) Screen Actors Guild nominated actress
 Al Ernest Garcia (1887–1938) actor and casting director active between 1911 and 1938, known for his association with Charlie Chaplin
 Jeff Garcia (born 1977) comedian and Annie Award-winning voice actor
 Jesse Garcia (born 1982) ALMA Award-winning actor
 Jessica Marie Garcia (born 1987) American actress known for On My Block (TV series), Mexican father
 Michael Garza (born 2000) American actor of Mexican descent (Scary Stories to Tell in the Dark)
 John Gavin (1931–2018) actor, politician and head of the Screen Actors Guild
 William Gaxton (1893–1963) actor of film and theatre
 Hunter Gomez (born 1991) American actor
 Selena Gomez (born 1992) actress, singer, model, spokesperson, Mexican father
 Xochitl Gomez (born 2005/2006) actress
 Eiza González (born 1990) actress, model and singer
 Mandy Gonzalez (born 1978) theater and film actress
 Myrtle Gonzalez (1891–1918) silent film actress; regarded as Hollywood's first Latin and Hispanic movie star
 Nicholas Gonzalez (born 1976) actor
 Pedro Gonzalez-Gonzalez (1925–2006) character actor
 Michele Greene (born 1962) Emmy nominated actress, best known for the role of Abigail Perkins on the series L.A. Law
 Adrian Grenier (born 1976) American actor, producer, director, musician and environmentalist. His mother is of Mexican and French descent  (Entourage).
 Lita Grey (1908–1995) silent film actress
 Jackie Guerra (born 1965) actress
 Noel Gugliemi (born 1970) actor
 Elizabeth Gutiérrez (born 1979) actress
 Froy Gutierrez (born 1998) actor
 Ryan Guzman (born 1987) actor, father of Mexican descent
 Nikki Hahn (born 2002) actress
 Gabriella Hall (born 1966) actress and model
 Laura Harring (born 1964) actress and Miss USA (1985)
 Salma Hayek (born 1966) Oscar, Emmy, and Golden Globe nominated actress, TV-film director and producer
 Callie Hernandez (born 1995) actress, singer
 Jay Hernandez (born 1978) actor
 Kristin Herrera (born 1989) actress
 Gabriel Iglesias (born 1976) actor and comedian
 Tony Dalton (born 1975) TV and film actor
 Osvaldo de León (born 1984) Telenovelas actor
 Ana Brenda Contreras (born 1986) TV actress
 Ryan Guzman (born 1987) TV actor
 Mónica Dionne (born 1967) film and TV actress
 Michael Irby (born 1972) actor
 Rebeca Iturbide (1924–2003) actress during the Mexican Age of Golden cinema
 Shar Jackson (born 1976) actress
 Anjelah Johnson (born 1982) actress, comedian, and former NFL cheerleader
 Susan Kohner (born 1936) Golden Globe winning and Oscar nominated actress, mother was Lupita Tovar, Mexican actress
 Apollonia Kotero (born 1959) actress, singer and model
 Samuel Larsen (born 1991) actor and singer
 Logan Lerman (born 1992) actor; (Mexican-born paternal grandmother of Russian Jewish descent)
 George J. Lewis (1903–1995) Mexican-born American actor (Zorro (1957 TV series))
 Sebastián Ligarde (born 1954) telenovela actor
 Iyari Limón (born 1976) actress
 Natalia Livingston (born 1976) Emmy Award-winning actress
 Eva Longoria (born 1975) Golden Globe nominated and Screen Actors Guild winning actress and model
 George Lopez (born 1961) actor and comedian
 Mario López (born 1973) actor and host
 Seidy López actress and director
 Linda Loredo (1907–1931) actress
 Gabriel Luna (born 1982) actor, best known for his role as Ghost Rider on the series Marvel's Agents of S.H.I.E.L.D
 Julio Macias (born 1976) actor from On My Block (TV series)
 Al Madrigal (born 1971) actor and comedian
 Angélica María (born 1944) actress and life-time Grammy Award-winning singer-songwriter. She was one of the main movie and TV attractions in Mexico during the 60s and 70s and the no. 1 record seller in the country during the same period
 Vanessa Marcil (born 1968) Emmy winning actress
 Xolo Maridueña (born 2001) actor
 Constance Marie (born 1965) actress
 Cheech Marin (born 1946) actor and comedian
 Ada Maris (born 1957) actress
 Chrispin Martin (1893–1953) actor
 A Martinez (born 1948) Emmy Award-winning actor
 Joaquín Martínez (1930–2012) actor, appeared in many Western films
 Kimberly McCullough (born 1978) actress, best known for her role as Robin Scorpio on the soap opera General Hospital
 Alex Meneses (born 1965) actress and model
 Alex Meraz (born 1985) actor
 Yvette Mimieux (born 1942) actress
 Lin-Manuel Miranda (born 1980) American actor, composer, lyricist,  singer, rapper, actor, producer, and playwright, known by his roles in Broadway musicals. He is of mostly Puerto Rican descent, but he also is a quarter Mexican.
 Ricardo Montalbán (1920–2009) Emmy and Screen Actors Guild award-winning actor
 Carlos Montalbán (1903–1991) actor
 Manny Montana (born 1983) American actor of Mexican descent
 Belita Moreno (born 1949) actress
 Lindsey Morgan (born 1990) Emmy nominated actress
 Bethany Mota (born 1995) social media personality
 Marisol Nichols (born 1973) actress
 Eva Noblezada (born 1996) actress and singer, two-time Tony Award nominee and Grammy winner
 Ramón Novarro (1899–1968) actor, one of the top box office attractions of the 1920s and early 1930s
 Lupita Nyong'o (born 1983) actress, born in Mexico City to Kenyan parents
 Bodie Olmos (born 1975) actor
 Edward James Olmos (born 1947) Golden Globe and Emmy winning actor and director
 Lupe Ontiveros (1942–2012) Emmy nominated actress
 Hayley Orrantia (born 1994) American actress, singer-songwriter. Her grandfather is of Mexican descent and she identifies as Latina.
 Jenna Ortega (born 2002) actress
 Joy Page (1924–2008) actress
 Sara Paxton (born 1988) actress and singer, mother is Mexican, of Mexican-Jewish descent
 Michael Peña (born 1976) actor
 Walter Perez (born 1982) actor
 Tony Perry (born 1986) guitarist
 Daniella Pineda (born 1987) actress
 Tyler Posey (born 1991) actor (mother of Mexican descent)
 Mishel Prada (born 1989) actress
 Jaime Preciado (born 1986) bassist
 Anthony Quinn (1915–2001) two-time Oscar winning actor
 Cierra Ramirez (born 1995) actress and model
 Efren Ramirez (born 1973) actor
 Danny Ramirez (born 1997) American actor of Colombian and Mexican descent
 Marisa Ramirez (born 1977) actress
 Sara Ramirez (born 1975) Tony Award-winning actress and singer
 Raylene (born 1977) pornographic actress
 Alex Reymundo comedian and actor
 Nicole Richie (born 1981) actress of partial Mexican descent
 Mona Rico (1907–1994) actress
 Lauren Ridloff (born 1978) Tony Award-nominated actress
 Emily Rios (born 1989) actress and model
 Lalo Rios (1927–1973) actor, active during the 1950s and 1960s
 James Roday (born 1976) actor, father of Mexican descent
 Lee Rodriguez actress (father is Mexican)
 Rico Rodriguez (born 1998) actor  
 Paul Rodriguez (born 1955) comedian and actor
 Patty Rodriguez radio host, entrepreneur, and children's book author
 Valente Rodriguez (born 1961) actor
 Gilbert Roland (1905–1994) two-time Golden Globe nominated actor
 Fernanda Romero (born 1983) actress
 Tina Romero (born 1949) Mexico-based actress
 Gabrielle Ruiz (born 1989) film and theater actress
 Teresa Ruiz (born 1988) actress, has won multiple international awards
 Andy Russell (1919–1992) born Andrés Rábago in Boyle Heights, California, to Mexican immigrant parents, he was a big-band crooner who sang "Bésame Mucho," the first Spanish-English bilingual song in U.S. recording history. He performed in movies, television, radio and stage in the U.S., México, and Latin America.
 Claudia Salinas (born 1981) actress and model
 Johnny A. Sanchez (born 1982) actor and comedian
 Lauren Sánchez (born 1969) news anchor, entertainment and media personality
 Ref Sanchez (1917–1986) actor and photographer
 Paul Sand (born 1935) Tony Award-winning actor
 Miguel Sandoval (born 1951) film and television actor
 Michael Saucedo (born 1970) actor
 Christian Serratos (born 1990) actress, model and singer, of part Mexican descent
 Vinessa Shaw (born 1976) actress
 Stephanie Sigman (born 1987) actress
 Zuleyka Silver (born 1991) actress, model
 Karla Souza (born 1985) film and television actress
 David Spielberg (1939–2016) film and television actor; mother was Mexican American
 Hilary Swank (born 1974) two-time Oscar winning actress (grandmother of Mexican descent)
 Scout Taylor-Compton (born 1989) actress and singer (mother of Mexican descent)
 Julia Goldani Telles (born 1995) actress
 Tessa Thompson (born 1983) actress
 Raquel Torres (1915–1987) actress, active during the 1920s to 1930s
 Renee Torres (1911–1998) Mexican American actress and the sister of Raquel Torres
 Emeraude Toubia (born 1989) actress, model
 Elena Tovar Daytime Emmy Award nominated actress
 Lupita Tovar (1910–2016) actress
 Danny Trejo (born 1944) actor
 Michael Trevino (born 1985) actor
 Alanna Ubach (born 1975) actress
 Natividad Vacío (1912–1996) actor
 Erik Valdez (born 1979) actor
 Jacob Vargas (born 1971) actor
 James Vasquez (born 1972) American actor and director to a Mexican father
 Ray Vasquez (1924–2019) American singer, musician, and actor
 Randy Vasquez (born 1961) American actor and director; brother of James Vasquez
 Lupe Vélez (1908–1944) one of the first successful Latin American actresses in the United States, began her career in the silent film era
 Vanessa Villela (born 1978) actress
 Melissa Villaseñor (born 1987) actress
 Nena von Schlebrügge (born 1941) actress
 Pee Wee (entertainer) (born 1988) actor and singer
 Victoria Wyndham (born 1945) two-time Emmy nominated actress
 Eduardo Xol (born 1966) actor
 Carmen Zapata (1927–2014) actress, appeared in over 100 films and TV series

Directors and filmmakers

 Elisa Marina Alvarado – American director
 Guillermo del Toro (born 1964) – film director
 Félix Enríquez Alcalá (born 1951) – television and film director
 Natalia Almada (born 1974) – documentary filmmaker
 Robert Alvarez (born 1948) – animator, television director, and writer
 John A. Alonzo (1934–2001) – influential cinematographer, Academy Award nominee and Emmy Award winner
 Michael Arias (born 1968) – anime filmmaker based in Japan
 Eva Aridjis (born 1974) – film director, screenwriter, TV writer
 Roberto Benabib (born 1959) – television writer, producer, and film director, Emmy Award nominee
 J. Robert Bren (1903–1981) – screenwriter and producers, wrote 30 films between the '30s and '50s
 Edward Carrere (1906–1084) – art director, Academy Award winner and two-time nominee
 Natalie Chaidez (born 1950) – writer and producer, Emmy Award nominee
 Fernanda Coppel – screenwriter and playwright
 Julio Hernández Cordón (born 1975) – director and screenwriter
 Terri Doty (born 1984) – animation voice actress, voice director, and writer
 Mike Elizalde (born 1960) – special makeup effects artist, Academy Award nominee
 Moctezuma Esparza (born 1949) – producer, Academy Award and Emmy Award nominee
 Carlos López Estrada (born 1988) – music video, commercial, and film director
 Hampton Fancher (born 1938) – producer and screenwriter
 William A. Fraker (1923–2010) – cinematographer, director, and producer, six-time Academy Award nominee
 Nick Gomez (born 1963) – American film director 
 Alfonso Gomez-Rejon (born 1972) – film and television director, two-time Emmy Award nominee
 Neal Jimenez (born 1960) –  screenwriter and film director
 Emile Kuri (1907–2000) – set decorator, won two Academy Awards and was nominated for six more in the category Best Art Direction
 William Douglas Lansford (1922–2013) – screenwriter, film producer, and author
 Paul Lerpae (1900–1989) – special effects artist, Academy Award nominee
 Jenée LaMarque (born 1980) – writer and director
 Bill Melendez (1916–2008) – animator, director, and producer, eight-time Emmy Award winner and Academy Award nominee
 Steven C. Melendez (born 1945) – animator, director, and producer, Emmy Award winner (son of Bill Melendez)
 Linda Mendoza (born 1950) – television and film director
 Lindsay Mendez (born 1983) – Tony Award-winning actress
 Adrian Molina (born 1985) – screenwriter, storyboard artist, and animation director, Emmy Award nominee
 Sylvia Morales (born 1943) – director, writer, and producer, Emmy Award nominee
 Gregory Nava (born 1949) – director, producer and screenwriter, Academy Award and Emmy Award nominee
 Edward James Olmos (born 1947) – director and actor, Emmy and Golden Globe winner
 Roberto Orci (born 1973) – screenwriter and producer
 Manuel Perez (animator) (1914–1981) – animator and animation director
 Polish brothers – screenwriters and producers
 Lourdes Portillo (born 1944) – Academy Award-nominated filmmaker
 Georgina Garcia Riedel – filmmaker and scriptwriter
 Jonas Rivera (born 1971) – producer with Pixar films, Academy Award winner
 Robert Rodríguez (born 1968) – director, producer and screenwriter
 Phil Roman (born 1930) – animation director, founder of Film Roman animation studio, six-time Emmy Award winner
 Bernardo Ruiz – documentary filmmaker
 Craig Saavedra (born 1963) – producer and director, two-time Tony Award nominee
 Victor Salva (born 1958) – filmmaker
 Jesús Salvador Treviño (born 1946) – television director, three-time Emmy Award nominee
 Jose Luis Valenzuela – theater and film director
 Jeff Valdez (born 1956) – producer, writer, and studio executive
 Luis Valdez (born 1940) – playwright and director
 Chris Weitz (born 1969) – writer, producer, director; grandmother was Mexican actress Lupita Tovar
 Paul Weitz (born 1965) – writer, producer, director; grandmother was Mexican actress Lupita Tovar
 Rudy Zamora (1910–1989) – animator and animation director, Emmy Award nominee

Models
 Arianny Celeste – MMA Ring Girl, model, TV host
 Nikita Dragun – YouTuber, make-up artist, and model
 Ayiiia Elizarraras – TV personality and model
 Wendolly Esparza – beauty pageant titleholder
 Yoanna House – model, fashion model, TV host and America's Next Top model Winner (Cycle 2)
 Erika Medina – model
 Christian Monzon – model and actor
 Naima Mora – model, fashion model, America's Next Top model winner (cycle 4)
 Carter Oosterhouse – Nautica and HGTV's Carter Can 
 Nia Sanchez – model, Miss USA 2014
 Mia St. John – professional boxer, model, businesswoman and tae kwon do champion
 Christian Serratos – actress, model and singer
 Ylianna Guerra – model, beauty pageant titleholder

Musicians, singers and music groups

 

 2Mex – rapper
 6ix9ine (born 1996) – rapper
 Paula DeAnda (born 1989) – singer
 Pepe Aguilar (born 1968) – singer
 Rikk Agnew (born 1958) – singer, musician
 Santiago Almeida (1911–1999) – musician, influential in the development of the musical genres of tejano and conjunto
 Anacani (born 1954) – singer
 B-Real (born 1970) – rapper
 Joan Baez (born 1941) – singer-songwriter, activist*
 Baby Bash (born 1975) – rapper
 Becky G (born 1997) – pop singer and rapper
 Berner –  rapper and entrepreneur
 Rebecca Black (born 1997) – singer
 Tony Bellamy (1946–2009) (Mexican/Yaqui) – musician and vocalist of the Native American rock band Redbone.
 Betzaida (born 1981) – Latin pop singer
 Cedric Bixler-Zavala (born 1974) – singer, musician
 The Blendells – soul band
 Chingo Bling – rapper
 Beau Bokan (born 1981) – lead vocalist
 Ally Brooke (born 1993) – singer, member of Fifth Harmony
 Juan Brujo – lead singer of Brujeria
 Sabrina Bryan (born 1984) – singer, actress
 Camila Cabello (born 1997) – singer 
 Chuck Cabot (1915–2007) – saxophonist and big band leader
 Carla Dirlikov Canales – mezzo-soprano singer
 Las Cafeteras – folk and traditional Mexican musical group
 Laura Canales (1954–2005) – Tejano singer
 Nati Cano (1933–2014) – Grammy Award-winning mariachi musician
 Stephen Carpenter (born 1970) – co-founder and lead guitarist of the band Deftones
 Vicki Carr (born 1941) – Grammy Award-winning singer
 Albert Castillo – music producer
 Emilio Castillo (born 1950) – founding member of Tower of Power
 Carlos Cavazo (born 1957) – lead guitarist of the rock band Quiet Riot
 Dino Cazares (born 1966) – guitarist
 Ingrid Chavez (born 1965) – singer-songwriter, poet
 Mark Chavez – musician
 El Chicano – soul and jazz band
 Chicano Batman – four-piece Chicano rock band
 Keyshia Cole – R&B singer (Paternal Mexican ancestry)
 Lisa Coleman (born 1960) – Grammy and ASCAP Award-winning musician/composer, funk keyboardist, member of Prince and The Revolution and Wendy and Lisa
 Ramiro Cortés (1933–1984) – classical composer
 Cuco (born 1998) – singer-songwriter, and producer 
 Kid Cudi (born 1984) – rapper, singer, record producer, and actor
 Marcos Curiel (born 1974) – guitarist
 Ray Dalton – singer (Mexican-American mother)
 Alfonso D'Artega (1907–1998) – songwriter and conductor
 Diana DeGarmo (born 1987) – singer, actress
 Fito de la Parra – drummer of Canned Heat
 Zack De La Rocha (born 1970) – rapper, singer, poet, lead member of Rage Against the Machine
 Gonzalo de la Torre (born 1977) – singer, musician
 Grey DeLisle (born 1973) – singer-songwriter, voice actress
 Andrew Martinez (1983–2009) – drummer
 Lhasa De Sela (1972–2010) – singer-songwriter
 Deorro (born 1991) – DJ
 Dev (singer) (born 1989) – singer, rapper, model and radio host
 Down AKA Kilo (born 1985) – rapper
 Nadir D'Priest – musician
 Sheila E. (born 1957) – musician
 Roberto Enrique – singer-songwriter, actor
 Joe Escalante (born 1963) – musician
 Alejandro Escovedo (born 1951) – singer-songwriter, musician
 Coke Escovedo (1941–1986) – percussionist
 Pete Escovedo (born 1935) – percussionist
 Mimi Fariña (1945–2001) – singer-songwriter 
 Louis Febre (born 1959) – Mexican-born composer
 Freddy Fender (1937–2006) – Tejano and country musician
 Fergie (born 1975) – singer-songwriter, actress, member of The Black Eyed Peas
 Rosita Fernández (1918–2006) – Tejano singer
 Aundrea Fimbres (born 1983) – singer, member of Danity Kane
 Dom Flemons (born 1982) – singer, Grammy nominee
 Paty Cantú (born 1983) – singer, musician
 Rosie Flores (born 1950) – rockabilly and country singer
 Mando Fresko (born 1987) – DJ, radio personality, actor
 Frost (born 1962) – rapper
 Kap G (born 1994) – rapper
 Victoria Galvan (born 1986) – singer, musician
 Andrew Garcia (born 1985) – musician, American Idol (Season 9 contestant)
 Eva Garza (1917–1966) – vocalist, film actress
 Gemini – rapper
 Vivica Genaux (born 1969) – operatic mezzo-soprano
 Girl In a Coma – rock band
 Juan Gotti – rapper
 Selena Gomez (born 1992) – singer, actress
 Lalo Guerrero (1916–2005) – singer-songwriter
 María Grever (1894–1951) – prolific Emmy Award-winning composer who achieved international recognition
 Ha*Ash – rock pop duo
 Cenobio Hernandez (1863–1950) – composer
 Daniel Hernandez – rapper also known as 6ix9ine
 Marcos Hernandez (born 1982) – singer-songwriter
 Miguel (born 1985) – recording artist, songwriter, producer of Mexican and African-American descent
 Raymond Herrera (born 1972) – drummer
 David Hidalgo (born 1954) – singer-songwriter
 Marques Houston (born 1981) – singer
 Intocable – Tejano band
 Frankie J (born 1975) – singer
 Johnny J (1969–2008) – multi-platinum music producer, rapper, songwriter
 Prima J – Pop duo
 Flaco Jiménez (born 1939) – accordionist, musician
 Santiago Jiménez Jr. (born 1944) – folk musician, won the National Heritage Fellowship for lifetime achievement in traditional Tex-Mex/folk music
 Little Joe (born 1940) – Tejano performer
 Maya Jupiter (born 1978) – DJ, emcee
 Jeanette Jurado (born 1965) – singer, member of the girl group Exposé which achieved much success between 1984 and 1993, becoming the first group to have four top ten hits on the Billboard Hot 100 chart from its debut album
 DJ Kane (born 1975) – singer
 Joshua Kadison (born 1965) – singer-songwriter
 Kehlani (born 1995) – singer
 Down AKA Kilo (born 1985) – rapper 
 Apollonia Kotero (born 1959) – actress, singer and model
 Stefano Langone (born 1989) – singer
 Shelly Lares (born 1971) – singer
 Kiana Lede (born 1997) – singer 
 Lucky Luciano – rapper
 A Lighter Shade of Brown – rap group
 The Lennon Sisters – vocal group, popular during the '50s and '60s
 Robert Lopez (born 1960) – musician
 Trini Lopez (1937–2020) – singer, guitarist
 Demi Lovato (born 1992) – singer and actress 
 Kirstin Maldonado (born 1992) – member of Grammy winning group Pentatonix
 Malo – Latin rock and roll soul band
 Angélica María (born 1944) – Lifetime Grammy Award-winning singer-songwriter and actress
 Marisela (born 1966) – singer
 Cruz Martínez (born 1972) – musician, music producer
 Narciso Martínez (1911–1992) – musician, influential in the development of the musical genres of tejano and conjunto
 Vicci Martinez (born 1984) – singer-songwriter
 Xiuhtezcatl Martinez (born 2000) – hip hop artist
 Javier Jose Mendoza (born 1978) – conductor
 Julia Michaels – singer-songwriter (Mexican-Puerto Rican father)
 Lydia Mendoza (1916–2007) – Tejano music singer
 Jorge Mester (born 1935) – conductor
 Roy Mitchell-Cardenas (born 1977) – rock bassist
 Laura Molina (born 1957) – singer, musician, artist, painter, muralist
 Chris Montez (born 1943) – singer, musician
 Manuel Mora (1919–2001) – musician
 Annette Moreno (born 1972) – Grammy nominated Spanish-language Christian music singer
 Chino Moreno (born 1973) – lead singer of Team Sleep and Deftones
 Ricardo Zohn-Muldoon (born 1962) – composer, a finalist for the 2011 Pulitzer Prize for Music
 Myra (born 1986) – singer-songwriter
 Natalie (born 1979) – singer-songwriter
 Los Nativos – rap group
 Emilio Navaira (1962–2016) – Tejano singer, Grammy Award winner
 Dave Navarro (born 1967) – guitarist
 Vince Neil (born 1961) – lead vocalist of the band Mötley Crüe
 Asia Nitollano (born 1988) – member of The Pussycat Dolls
 OhGeesy (born 1993) – rapper and member of Shoreline Mafia
 Pete Orta (born 1971) – Grammy Award-winning guitarist Petra
 José Pasillas (born 1976) – drummer
 Sara Paxton (born 1988) – singer, actress
 Pee Wee (born 1988) – singer-songwriter, actor
 Jennifer Peña (born 1983) – Tejano singer
 Bobby Pulido (born 1971) – singer-songwriter
 Amanda Perez (born 1980) – singer-songwriter
 Chris Pérez (born 1969) – singer, operatic soprano
 Chris Pérez – Grammy Award-winning guitarist
 Jay Perez (born 1963) – Tejano singer
 Yolanda Pérez (born 1983) – musician, singer
 Romina Power (born 1951) – singer-songwriter, actress
 Snow Tha Product (born 1987) – rapper
 A.B. Quintanilla (born 1963) – musician, music producer
 Abraham Quintanilla (born 1939) – singer-songwriter
 Elida Reyna (born 1972) – Tejano singer
 Johnny Richards (1911–1968) – jazz composer active during the 1950s and 1960s
 Jenni Rivera (1969–2012) – singer-songwriter
 Lil Rob (born 1975) – rapper
 Roger Rocha – singer-songwriter, guitarist for the group 4 Non Blondes
 Johnny Rodriguez (born 1951) – country music singer
 Robert Xavier Rodriguez (born 1946) – classical composer
 Sixto Rodriguez (born 1942) – folk musician
 Chan Romero (born 1941) – singer, musician
 Linda Ronstadt (born 1946) – Grammy Award-winning musician
 Rick Rosas (1949–2014) – singer, musician, bassist for Joe Walsh and Niel Young, Crosby Stills Nash and Young, Buffalo Springfield, Crazy horse
 Andy Russell (1919–1992) vocalist, specializing in traditional pop and Latin music. His parents were Mexican immigrants
 Sam the Sham (born 1937) – leader of Sam the Sham and the Pharaohs
 Adán Sánchez (1979–2004) – singer, son of legendary Chalino Sanchez
 Antonio Sanchez (born 1971) – jazz drummer, composed film score for the film Birdman, Golden Globe nominated
 Jessica Sanchez (born 1995) – singer. Her father is a Mexican American, originally from Texas, and is a US Navy veteran.  Her mother is a Filipina from Samal, Bataan, in the Philippines.
 Hope Sandoval (born 1966) – singer-songwriter
 Esteban Jordan (1939–2010) – singer-songwriter
 Sonny Sandoval (born 1974) – singer, member of P.O.D.
 Carlos Santana (born 1947) – Grammy Award-winning guitarist
 Selena Quintanilla-Pérez (1971–1995) – Tejano superstar / Grammy award-winning singer
 Jessy Serrata (1953–2017) – Tejano musician
 Arban Severin (born 1976) – musician, actress
 Mariee Sioux (born 1985) – folk singer-songwriter
 Denise Stefanie (born 1988) – singer
 Steve Soto (1963–2018) – punk rock guitarist
 Comanche Sound – Grammy nominated producer
 Shakey Graves (born 1987) – Americana musician
 Esperanza Spalding (born 1984) – jazz singer, musician
 Taboo (born 1975) – rapper, member of The Black Eyed Peas
 Abel Talamantez (born 1978) – singer
 John Tejada (born 1974) – electronic musician, music producer
 Thee Midniters – rock and soul band
 Melody Thornton (born 1984) – singer, model, member of The Pussycat Dolls
 Tierra – R&B, soul band
 Randy Torres – guitarist
 Tina Piña Trachtenburg – rock pop band
 Robert Treviño (born 1984) – music conductor
 Robert Trujillo (born 1964) – bassist
 John Trudell (1946–2015) – musician, author, poet, political activist
 Chayito Valdez (1945–2016) – singer, actress
 Ritchie Valens (1941–1959) – singer, musician
 Patrick and Lolly Vegas – Mexican/Yaqui/Shoshone musicians and vocalists of the Native American rock band Redbone.
 Jaci Velasquez (born 1979) – contemporary Christian Latin pop singer
 Julieta Venegas (born 1970) – singer-songwriter, instrumentalist
 Cassie Ventura (born 1986) – singer-songwriter and dancer
 Angela Via (born 1981) – singer-songwriter
 Jasmine Villegas (born 1993) – R&B, pop singer
 Kyle Vincent – singer-songwriter; producer
 Lil Xan (born 1996) – rapper
 Yeat (born 2000) – rapper
 Taco Shop Poets – spoken word and world music band
 The Zeros – punk-rock band

Authors and poets

 Oscar Zeta Acosta (1935–1974) – minor novelist, activist, attorney and politician
 Francisco X. Alarcon (1954–2016) – author, poet, activist, and college professor
 Alurista (born 1947) – poet, activist, and college professor
 María Amparo Ruiz De Burton (1832–1895) – author
 James Anaya – poet
 Rudolfo Anaya (1937–2020) – author
 Gloria E. Anzaldúa (1942–2004) – author, poet, scholar and activist
 Chloe Aridjis – novelist
 Alfred Arteaga – poet and writer
 Carmen Beltrán (1905–2002) – poet and playwright
 Silvester Brito (1937–2018) – poet and academic
 Norma Elia Cantú (born 1947) – writer and professor
 Ana Castillo (born 1953) – author, novelist, poet and essayist
 Lorna Dee Cervantes (born 1954) – poet
 Ingrid Chavez (born 1965) – singer- songwriter and poet
 Sandra Cisneros (born 1954) – author, novelist and poet
 María Antonieta Collins (born 1952) – TV host, journalist and author
 Lucha Corpi (born 1945) – poet and writer
 Carlos Cumpián (born 1953) – author and poet
 María Amparo Escandón (born 1957) – novelist, screenwriter, advertising creative director, and film producer.
 Diana Gabaldon (born 1952) – novelist
 Dana Gioia (born 1950) – writer, chairman of the National Endowment of the Arts
 Guillermo Gómez-Peña (born 1955) – artist, author, poet and activist
 Rigoberto González (born 1970) – author and critic
 Rodolfo Gonzales (1928–2005) – political activist, poet and featherweight boxing champion
 Reyna Grande (born 1975) – author, memoirist
 Juan Felipe Herrera (born 1948) – poet, author, translator and activist
 Miriam Herrera – author and poet
 Rolando Hinojosa (born 1929) – author, novelist, poet and essayist
 Luis Leal (writer) (1907–2010) – writer and literary critic
 Elizabeth Martínez – activist and author
 Paul Martínez Pompa – author and poet
 José Montalvo (1946–1994) – author, poet and activist
 José Montoya (1932–2013) – artist and poet
 Pat Mora (born 1942) – author and poet
 Cherríe Moraga (born 1952) – author, poet, essayist and activist
 Angela Morales (born 1966) – award-winning essayist
 Julian Nava (1927–2022) – author, educator and diplomat
 Daniel Olivas (born 1959) – author and attorney
 Americo Paredes (1915–1999) – novelist
 Tomás Rivera (1935–1984) – author, poet and educator
 Alberto Rios (born 1952) – American poet and author
 Luis J. Rodriguez (born 1954) – author, poet, novelist, journalist, critic and columnist
 Richard Rodriguez (born 1944) – author
 Pam Muñoz Ryan (born 1951) – award-winning children's author
 Luis Omar Salinas (1937–2008) – author and poet
 raúlrsalinas (1934–2008) – activist and poet
 Erika Sánchez (born 1984) – author and poet
 Ricardo Sánchez (1941–1995) – poet and professor
 Ricardo Sanchez (born 1953) – author and United States Army general
 Jimmy Santiago Baca (born 1952) – author and poet
 John Phillip Santos (born 1957) – author, journalist, and filmmaker
 Leslie Marmon Silko (born 1948) – writer, key figure in the First Wave of the Native American Literary Renaissance
 Octavio Solis (born 1958) – award-winning playwright and director
 Gary Soto (born 1952) – author and poet
 Luis Talamantez (born 1943) – poet and activist 
 Sergio Troncoso (born 1961) – author, novelist, short-story writer and essayist
 John Trudell (1946–2015) – musician, author, poet and political activist
 Luís Alberto Urrea (born 1955) – author, poet, novelist and essayist
 José Antonio Villarreal (1924–2010) – author and novelist
 Victor Villaseñor (born 1940) – author and public speaker
 Maria Helena Viramontes (born 1954) – author and professor
 Karen Zacarias (born 1969) – award-winning playwright

Visual arts

 Manuel Gregorio Acosta (1921–1989) – artist, painter and illustrator
 Lalo Alcaraz (born 1964) – artist, editorial/comic strip cartoonist
 Juana Alicia (born 1953) – artist, painter and activist
 Carlos Almaraz (1941–1989) – street artist and muralist
 Axel Alonso – American comic book creator (in DC Comics from 1994 to 2000, and at Marvel Comics from 2000 to the present).
 Pete Alvarado (1920–2004) – animation and comicbook artist
 Cecilia Alvarez (born 1950) – artist, painter and muralist
 Natalia Anciso (born 1985) – artist and educator
 Sergio Aragonés (born 1937) – cartoonist, writer
 Don Gregorio Antón (born 1956) – artist, photographer and educator
 Alfonso Arana (1927–2005) – artist and painter
 Fortunato Arriola (1827–1872) – artist and painter
 Gus Arriola (1917–2008) – artist and comic Strip cartoonist
 Judy Baca (born 1946) – artist, painter, muralist and activist
 Patrociño Barela (1900–1964) – artist, wood sculptor
 Santa Barraza (born 1951) – artist, painter and activist
 Galo Canote (born 1970) (also known as "Make", "MakeOne" or "LoveGalo") – graffiti artist, painter, muralist and activist
 Mel Casas (1929–2014) – artist, painter and activist
 Ako Castuera (born 1950) – artist who is best known for being a writer and storyboard artist on the animated television series Adventure Time
 Yreina Cervantez (born 1952) – artist, painter, activist and muralist
 Jean Charlot (1898–1979) – painter and illustrator
 Miguel Condé (born 1939) – artist, painter and print-maker
 Peter Coffin (born 1972) – artist and painter
 Salvador Corona (1895–1990) – folk-art style painter
 Enrique Chagoya (born 1953) – artist, painter and print-maker
 Alfredo de Batuc (born 1950) – artist
 Edgar De Evia (1910–2003) – photographer
 Jerry De La Cruz (born 1948) – artist and painter
 Roberto De La Rocha (born 1943) – artist, painter and muralist
 Daniel Martin Diaz (born 1967) – artist and painter
 Richard Dominguez (born 1960) – comic book artist and Illustrator.
 Carlos Dorrien (born 1948) – artist and sculptor
 Rodolfo Escalera (1929–2000) – artist, painter
 Elsa Flores (born 1955) – street artist
 Diane Gamboa (born 1957) – artist and painter
 Harry Gamboa Jr. (born 1951) – performance artist, photographer and essayist
 Carmen Lomas Garza (born 1948) – artist, painter and illustrator
 Guillermo Gómez-Peña (born 1955) – performance artist, author, activist and educator
 David Gonzales (born 1964) – cartoonist
 Gronk (born 1954) – performance artist, painter and print-maker
 Pedro E. Guerrero (1917–2012) – photographer, one of the most sought-after architectural photographers of the 1950s
 Ester Hernandez (born 1944) – artist and painter
 Javier Hernandez (born 1966) – comic book artist and radio host
 Judithe Hernández (born 1948) – painter, activist, educator, and public artist
 Luis Jimenez (1940–2006) – artist and sculptor
 Yolanda Lopez (born 1942) – artist, painter, print-maker, educator and movie producer
 Gilbert Luján (1940–2011) – artist, painter, muralist and sculptor
 James Luna (1950–2018) – installation artist
 Alex Martinez – graffiti artist, illustrator, muralist
 Xavier Martínez (1869–1943) – artist, painter and teacher
 Bill Melendez (1916–2008) – animator
 Alberto Mijangos (1925–2007) – artist and painter
 Mister Cartoon (born 1970) – tattoo and Graffiti artist
 Laura Molina (born 1957) – artist, painter, muralist, and musician
 Franco Mondini-Ruiz (born 1961) – visual artist
 Rhode Montijo (born 1966) – comic book artist and co-creator of the cartoon Happy Tree Friends.
 Rafael Navarro (born 1967) – comic book artist
 Ray Navarro (1964–1990) – artist, filmmaker, and HIV/AIDS activist
 Manuel Neri (born 1930)– artist, painter, print-maker and sculptor
 Victor Ochoa (born 1948) – painter, muralist and activist
 Estevan Oriol – photographer and director
 Martín Ramírez (1895–1963) – self-taught artist
 Michael Ramirez (born 1961) – Pulitzer Award-winning cartoonist
 Daniel "Chaka" Ramos (born 1972) – graffiti artist
 Miguel Angel Reyes (born 1964) – artist, painter, print-maker, muralist, Illustrator and Instructor
 Anita Rodriguez (born 1941) – artist and painter
 Isis Rodriguez (born 1964) – contemporary painter
 Carlos Saldaña (born 1997) – comic book artist and comedian
 John August Swanson (born 1938) – visual artist
 Patssi Valdez (born 1951) – painter, artist and activist
 Mark Vallen (born 1953) – artist, figurative realist painter, activist, curator and blogger
 Kathy Vargas (born 1950) – artist and painter
 Rafael Vargas-Suarez (born 1972) – contemporary artist, painter and photographer
 Emigdio Vasquez (1939–2014) – artist and muralist
 Jhonen Vasquez (born 1974) – cartoonist, comic book and author
 Joe Vera (born 1941) – graphic artist
 Esteban Villa (born 1930) – artist and muralist
 Kat Von D (born 1982) – tattoo artist and TV personality

Dance

 Michael Balderrama (born 1973) – choreographer, Broadway dancer, and producer
 Corky Ballas (born 1960) – ballroom dancer, holds several Latin dance championship titles
 Mark Ballas (born 1986) – Emmy nominated choreographer, dancer, and musician
 Evelyn Cisneros (born 1958) – ballerina, instructor
 René Elizondo Jr. (born 1962) – dancer, music video director
 Rosa Ramirez Guerrero (born 1934) – founder of the International Folklorico Dance Group
 Cynthia Harvey (born 1957) – former American Ballet Theatre and Royal Ballet principal dancer, artistic director of Jacqueline Kennedy Onassis School
 Tina Landon (born 1963) – choreographer who has worked with numerous musical performers
 José Limón (1908–1972) – influential dancer and choreographer, active between 1929 and 1969
 Nicholas Magallanes (1922–1977) – principal dancer for the New York City Ballet
 Viktor Manoel (born 1957) – choreographer, writer, and actor
 Tony Meredith (born 1958) – ballroom dancer, choreographer, and US Latin dance Champion
 Tina Ramirez (1929–2022) – dancer and choreographer, founder of Ballet Hispanico, the leading Hispanic dance company in the United States.
 Maclovia Ruiz (1910–2005) – dancer with the San Francisco Ballet in the 1930s
 Eva Tessler (born 1955) – director, playwright, and dancer

Drag performers
Adore Delano
Crystal Methyd
Delta Work
Denali
Jorgeous
Landon Cider
Valentina

Journalists

 Gustavo Arellano (born 1979) – editor at the Los Angeles Times and writer/creator of ¡Ask a Mexican!
 Ron Arias (born 1941) – highly regarded Chicano writer and correspondent
 Jim Avila – TV journalist and correspondent
 Ana Cabrera (born 1982) – television news anchor
 Ricardo Celis (born 1962) – Spanish language sportscaster
 María Antonieta Collins (born 1952) – TV host, journalist, and author
 Mandalit del Barco – award-winning art and culture reporter for National Public Radio
 Laura Diaz (born 1958) – Southern California newscaster and co-anchor of CBS 2 News
 Giselle Fernández (born 1961) – TV journalist and reporter
 Anselmo L. Figueroa (1861–1915) – journalist and political figure
 John Carlos Frey (born 1969) – investigative journalist
 Luis De La Garza (born 1954) – TV and radio host
 Christy Haubegger (born 1968) – movie producer and founder of Latina Magazine
 Maria Hinojosa (born 1961) – broadcast journalist and correspondent
 Monica C. Lozano (born 1956) – editor, publisher, and CEO of La Opinión, the largest Spanish language newspaper
 Rubén Martínez (writer) (born 1962) – award-winning journalist and author
 Tony Ortega (journalist) (born 1963) – newspaper editor, blogger
 Raul Peimbert (born 1962) – Spanish language TV journalist and newscaster
 John Quiñones (born 1952) – news correspondent, award-winning journalist
 Jorge Ramos (born 1958) – Spanish-language TV news anchor and journalist
 Naibe Reynoso (born 1973) – TV journalist and reporter
 Rubén Salazar (1928–1970) – TV journalist and reporter
 María Elena Salinas (born 1954) – Spanish language TV news anchor and journalist
 Lauren Sánchez (born 1969) – Emmy Award-winning journalist

Political figures

 Oscar Zeta Acosta (1935–1974) – politician, attorney, minor novelist and activist
 Katherine Archuleta – political executive
 Alexander Arvizu – United States Ambassador to Albania from 2010 to 2015
 Romana Acosta Bañuelos (1925–2018) – former Treasurer of the United States
 Pete Aguilar (born 1979) – U.S. representative (CA-31)
 Mike Aguirre (born 1949) – former city attorney of San Diego, California
 Juan Bautista Alvarado (1809–1882) – twice governor of Alta California from 1836 to 1837 and 1838 to 1842
 Toney Anaya (born 1941) – U.S. Democratic Politician and Former Governor of New Mexico
 Jerry Apodaca (born 1934) – former Governor of New Mexico
 Jesse Arreguin (born 1984) – Mayor of Berkeley, California
 Ruben Ayala (1922–2012) – Mayor of Chino, California
 Hector Balderas (born 1973) – Attorney General of New Mexico
 Nanette Barragán (born 1976) – U.S. representative (CA-44)
 Rosemary Barkett (born 1939) – Chief Justice of the Florida Supreme Court
 Xavier Becerra (born 1958) – Attorney General of California, U.S. representative (CA-31)
 Jaime Herrera Beutler (born 1978) – U.S Representative (WA 3)
 Polly Baca (born 1941) – served as Chair of the Democratic Caucus of the Colorado House of Representatives
 Gina M. Benavides (born 1962) – justice at the Texas Thirteenth Court of Appeals
 George P. Bush (born 1976) – son of Jeb Bush
 Cruz Bustamante (born 1953) – former California lieutenant governor
 Ezequiel Cabeza de Baca (1864–1917) – Former Governor of New Mexico
 Anna Escobedo Cabral (born 1959) – 42nd Treasurer of the United States
 Kiki Camarena (1947–1985) – undercover agent for the United States Drug Enforcement Administration
 Salud Carbajal (born 1964) – U.S. representative (CA-24)
 Tony Cárdenas (born 1963) – U.S. representative (CA-29)
 Carlos Antonio Carrillo (1783–1852) – Gobernador of Alta California, (1837–1838). His father, José Raimundo Carrillo, came from Loreto, México.
 José Antonio Carrillo (1796–1862) – Californio ranchero, official and political. He was brother of Carlos Antonio Carrillo.
 Juan José Carrillo (1842–1916) – first mayor of Santa Monica, California
 Rubén Castillo (born 1954) – Chief Judge of the United States District Court for the Northern District of Illinois
 Joaquin Castro (born 1974) – United States Representative from Texas
 José Castro (California, 1808 – February 1860) – acting governor of Alta California in 1835–1836, and Commandante General of the Mexican army in Alta California at the time of the 1846 Bear Flag Revolt and the Mexican–American War of 1846–1848
 Julian Castro (born 1974) – Mayor of San Antonio, U.S. Secretary of Housing and Urban Development, and 2020 U.S. presidential candidate  
 Raul Hector Castro (1916–2015) – Governor of Arizona
 Lauro Cavazos (1927–2022) – secretary of education
 Gabe Cazares (1920–2006) – former mayor of Clearwater, Florida
 Dennis Chavez (1888–1962) – U.S. senator from New Mexico
 Henry Cisneros (born 1947) – former Secretary of Housing and Urban Development and mayor of San Antonio, Texas
 Lou Correa (born 1958) – U.S. House of Representatives (CA 46)
 Henry Cuellar (born 1955) – U.S. House of Representatives Texas's 28th congressional district
 Mariano-Florentino Cuéllar (born 1972) – justice of the Supreme Court of California
 Gonzalo P. Curiel (born 1953) – district judge
 James DeAnda (1925–2006) – attorney and United States federal judge, noted for his activities in defense of Hispanic civil rights, particularly as a plaintiff's attorney in Hernandez v. Texas.
 Elena J. Duarte (born 1966) – Associate Justice of the California Court of Appeal
 Ben Fernandez (1925–2000) – American politician, financial consultant and special ambassador. He was a member of the Republican Party. He ran for President of the United States in 1980, 1984 and 1988, making him America's first major-party presidential contender of Hispanic origin
 Mario Gallegos Jr. (1950–2012) – Texas state senator
 Pete Gallego (born 1961) – former U.S. representative (TX 23)
 Ruben Gallego (born 1979) – U.S. representative (AZ 7)
 Tony Gallegos (1924–2018) – Chairman of the Equal Employment Opportunity Commission
 Jesus "Chuy" Garcia (born 1956) – Cook County Commissioner, former Member of Illinois State Senate, Mayor Candidate for the city of Chicago
 Ruben Garcia Jr. (born 1951) – former executive assistant director of FBI
 Edward D. Garza (born 1969) – mayor
 Margarito C. Garza (1931–1995) – district judge, comic book creator
 José Antonio de la Garza (1776–1851?) – Mayor of San Antonio, Texas (in 1813 and 1832), the first landowner in San Antonio and the first man to create a coin in this state.
 Reynaldo Guerra Garza (1915–2004) – first Hispanic judge appointed to the U.S. Court of Appeals
 Tony Garza (born 1959) – U.S. ambassador to Mexico
 Eric Garcetti (born 1971) – Mayor of Los Angeles
 Gil Garcetti (born 1941) – former Los Angeles district attorney
 Alberto Gonzales (born 1955) – United States Attorney General
 Henry Gonzalez (1916–2000) – U.S. representative (Texas)
 Irma Elsa Gonzalez (born 1948) – federal judge
 Matt Gonzalez (born 1965) – politician, member of the Green Party
 Rafael Gonzales (1789–1857) – native of San Antonio, Texas, he was governor of Coahuila and Texas.
 Ron Gonzales (born 1951) – former mayor of San José, California
 Steven Gonzalez (born 1963) – Justice of the Washington Supreme Court
 Vicente Gonzalez (born 1967) – U.S. House of Representatives (TX 15)
 Raúl Grijalva (born 1948) – U.S. House of Representatives (AZ 3)
 Michelle Lujan Grisham (born 1959) – Governor of New Mexico and former U.S. representative (NM 1)
 Philip S. Gutierrez (born 1959) – U.S. district judge
 Eva Guzman (born 1961) – member of Texas Supreme court
 Roger Hernández (born 1975) – Mayor of West Covina, California
 Ruben Hinojosa (born 1940) – U.S. representative (Texas 15)
 Ruben Kihuen (born 1980) – U.S. representative (NV 4)
 Octaviano Ambrosio Larrazolo (1859–1930) – former governor of New Mexico and first Latino to serve United States Senate
 Oscar Leeser (born 1958) – Mayor of El Paso
 Mike Levin (born 1978) – U.S. Representative for California's 49th congressional district since 2019.
 Sam Liccardo (born 1970) – Mayor of San Jose, California
 Carmen Lomellin (born 1950) – ambassador
 Marco A. López Jr. (born 1978) – Mayor of Nogales, Arizona
 Manuel Lujan Jr. (1928–2019) – U.S. representative from New Mexico
 Roberto de la Madrid (1922–2010) – governor of Baja California
 Abel Maldonado (born 1967) – 47th Lieutenant Governor of California
 Rosario Marin (born 1958) – 41st Treasurer of the United States
 Catherine Cortez Masto (born 1964) – U.S. senator
 Susana Martinez (born 1959) – former governor of New Mexico
 Harold Medina (1888–1990) – Senior Judge of United States Court of Appeals for the Second Circuit
 Marina Marmolejo (born 1971) – District judge
 Paul Miller, better known by his online alias GypsyCrusader – far-right political commentator, streamer, white supremacist, former Muay Thai fighter and convicted felon. His mother is Mexican 
 Gloria Molina (born 1948) – Los Angeles County Supervisor and former vice-chair of the Democratic National Committee
 Joseph Montoya (1915–1978) – former U.S. senator from New Mexico
 David Sánchez Morales (1925–1978) – CIA operative
 Carlos R. Moreno (born 1948) – Supreme Court Justice, California
 Ramiro Muñiz, known as Ramsey Muñiz (1942–2022) – first Hispanic whose name appeared on a Texas gubernatorial general election ballot, in 1972 and 1974, each time as the nominee of the Raza Unida Party but lost both elections.
 Mary H. Murguia (born 1960) – federal judge
 Ramón Músquiz (1797–1867) – Governor of Coahuila and Texas from 1830 to 1831 and in 1835.
 Fabian Núñez (born 1966) – California State Representative, current Speaker of the California State Assembly
 Estevan Ochoa (1831–1888) – historic mayor of Tucson, Arizona, he was the first Mexican-American mayor after the Gadsen Purchase of 1854 
 Fernando M. Olguin (born 1961) – district judge from California
 Darleen Ortega (born 1962) – judge on the Oregon Court of Appeals
 Katherine D. Ortega (born 1934) – 38th Treasurer of the United States
 Solomon Ortiz (born 1937) – U.S. representative (TX-27)
 Mariano S. Otero (1844–1904) – Delegate from the Territory of New Mexico
 Miguel Antonio Otero (1859–1944) – former Governor of New Mexico
 Romualdo Pacheco (1831–1899) – governor of California
 Alex Padilla (born 1973) – U.S. senator, former California secretary of state, former Los Angeles City Council Member
 Steve Padilla (born 1967) – former mayor of Chula Vista, California
 Richard Paez (born 1947) – federal judge on the United States Court of Appeals for the Ninth Circuit
 Federico Peña (born 1947) – former mayor of Denver, Colorado, former United States Secretary of Transportation and former United States Secretary of Energy
 Francisco Perea (1830–1913) – Delegate from the Territory of New Mexico
 Andrés Pico (1810–February 14, 1876) – was, as the political administration changed, a mixed-race Californio youth; a successful rancher and commander; and an influential American politician; in 19th century California. He was brother of Pío Pico
 Pío Pico (May 5, 1801 – September 11, 1894) – last Governor of Alta California (now the State of California) under Mexican rule
 Miguel A. Pulido (born 1956) – Mayor of Santa Ana, California
 Jose Maria Redondo (1830–1878) – Mayor of Yuma, Arizona
 Anthony Rendon (born 1968) – Speaker of the California State Assembly.
 Cruz Reynoso (1931–2021) – judge on the Supreme Court of California, Presidential Medal of Freedom (recipient)
 Bill Richardson (born 1947) – former governor of New Mexico, former U.S. Secretary of Energy
 Rebecca Rios (born 1967) – Arizona state senator
 Rosa Rios (born 1965) – 43rd and current treasurer of the United States, businesswoman, executive and entrepreneur.
 Albert Robles – politician and convicted criminal
 Regina M. Rodriguez (born 1963) – US district judge
 Gloria Romero (born 1955) – Democratic majority leader in the California State Senate, college professor
 Trinidad Romero (1835–1918) – Delegate to United States Congress from the Territory of New Mexico
 Edward Roybal (1916–2005) – former U.S. representative from California
 Ernesto Ruffo Appel (born 1952) – politician and former governor of Baja California
 Raul Ruiz (politician) (born 1972) – U.S. representative (CA 36)
 Mary Salas (born 1948) – former California Assembly representative
 John Salazar (born 1953) – U.S. representative (CO-3)
 Ken Salazar (born 1955) – U.S. senator (CO)
 Loretta Sanchez (born 1960) – U.S. representative (CA-47)
 Linda Sánchez (born 1969) – U.S. representative (CA-39)
 Brian Sandoval (born 1963) – Governor of Nevada 
 Gerardo Sandoval (born 1962) – judge of the Superior Court of California
 Hilda Solis (born 1957) – U.S. Secretary of Labor, former U.S. representative (CA-32)
 Raymond Telles (1915–2013) – first mayor of a large American city (El Paso, Texas)
 Esteban Edward Torres (born 1930) – former Representatives, U.S. ambassador to UNESCO, and labor activist
Ken Trujillo – former candidate for mayor of Philadelphia. He created largest not for profit serving Hispanic community in Philadelphia, The  Congreso, which is now one of the largest anti-poverty advocates in the nation and served Philadelphia as City Solicitor and an Assistant U.S. Attorney.
 Abelardo L. Valdez – diplomat and lawyer, President and Vice Chair of the Council of American Ambassadors
 Judith Valles (born 1933) – Mayor of San Bernardino, California
 Juan Vargas (born 1961) – U.S. representative (CA-51)
 Gaddi Vasquez (born 1955) – U.S. ambassador and 8th United States representative to the United Nations Food and Agriculture Organization
 Martha Vázquez (born 1953) – federal judge
 Blanca Vela (1936–2014) – former mayor of Brownsville, Texas
 Filemon Vela Jr. (born 1963) – U.S. representative (TX-34)
 Andrew Velasquez (born 1969) – Regional Administrator for the U.S. Department of Homeland Security's Federal Emergency Management Agency (FEMA)
 Antonio Villaraigosa (born 1953) – former mayor of Los Angeles
 Barbara Vucanovich (1921–2013) – American Republican politician. She was the first Latino American to serve in the House of Representatives, representing Nevada.  
 Kim McLane Wardlaw (born 1954) – federal judge, US Court of Appeals
 Joe Wardy (born 1953) – former mayor of El Paso, Texas
 Mary Yu (born 1957) – associate justice of the Washington Supreme Court

Military

 Anthony Acevedo (1924–2018) –  soldier during World War II whose diary was instrumental in documenting Nazi atrocities.
 Bertrand Blanchard Acosta (1895–1954) – aviator, fighter pilot
 Lucian Adams (1922–2003) – Medal of Honor (World War II)
 Michael J. Aguilar (born 1950) – Marine Corps brigadier general
 Everett Alvarez Jr. (born 1937) – Navy LCdr/pilot who endured 8.5 years in Vietnamese captivity and one of the longest periods as a U.S. prisoner of war (POW)
 Cipriano Andrade (1840 – 1911) – served in the United States Navy for forty years
 Juan G. Ayala – two-star General in the U.S. Marine Corps and former Commander of the Marine Corps Installations Command
 Joe R. Baldonado (1930–1950) – Medal of Honor (Korean War)
 David B. Barkley (1899–1918) – Medal of Honor (World War I)
 Roy Benavidez (1935–1998) – Medal of Honor (Vietnam War)
 Pedro Cano (1920–1952) – Medal of Honor (World War II)
 Robert Cardenas (1920–2022) – U.S. Air Force brigadier general
 Richard E. Cavazos (1929–2017) – first U.S. Army Hispanic 4-star general, Distinguished Service Cross (Korea and Vietnam)
 Manuel Antonio Chaves (1818? – 1889) – soldier in the Mexican Army and rancher in New Mexico. 
 Kathlene Contres (born 1955) – U.S. Navy
 Emilio A. De La Garza (1949–1970) – Medal of Honor (Vietnam War)
 Ralph Ellis Dias (1950–1969) – Medal of Honor (Vietnam War)
 Jesus S. Duran (1948–1977) – Medal of Honor (Vietnam War)
 Victor H. Espinoza (1929–1986) – Medal of Honor (Korean War)
 Santiago J. Erevia (1946–2016) – Medal of Honor (Vietnam War)
 Daniel Fernandez (1944–1966) – Medal of Honor (Vietnam War)
 José María Flores (1818–1866) – General and Governor of Alta California (Mexican–American War)
 Guy Gabaldon (1926–2006) – Navy Cross recipient, credited with capturing (or persuading to surrender) about 1,500 Japanese soldiers and civilians during the Battle of Saipan (World War II)
 Joe Gandara (1924–1944) – Medal of Honor (World War II)
 Candelario Garcia (1944–2013) – Medal of Honor (Vietnam War)
 Marcario Garcia (1920–1972) – Medal of Honor (World War II)
 Edward Gomez (1932–1951) – Medal of Honor (Korean War)
 Eduardo C. Gomez (1919–1972) – Medal of Honor (Korean War)
 Harold Gonsalves (1926–1945) – Medal of Honor (World War II)
 David M. Gonzales (1923–1945) – Medal of Honor (World War II)
 Alfredo Cantu "Freddy" Gonzalez (1946–1968) – Medal of Honor, KIA in Huế (Vietnam)
 Ambrosio Guillen (1929–1953) – Medal of Honor (Korean War)
 Rodolfo P. Hernandez (1931–2013) – Medal of Honor (Korean War)
 Silvestre S. Herrera (1917–2007) – Medal of Honor (World War II)
 Edward Hidalgo (1912–1995) – former Secretary of the Navy
 Jose F. Jimenez (1946–1969) – Medal of Honor (Vietnam)
 Miguel Keith (1951–1970) – Medal of Honor (Vietnam)
 Salvador J. Lara (1920–1945) – Medal of Honor (World War II)
 Felix Z. Longoria Jr. (1920–1945) – first Mexican American buried in Arlington National Cemetery (World War II)
 Jose M. Lopez (1910–2005) – Medal of Honor (World War II)
 Benito Martinez (1932–1952) – Medal of Honor (Korean War)
 Joe P. Martinez (1920–1943) – Medal of Honor (World War II)
 Joseph V. Medina (born 1953) – Brigadier General
 Louis Gonzaga Mendez Jr. (1915–2001) – highly decorated colonel, commander of the 3rd Battalion, 508th Parachute Infantry Regiment (World War II). He was born in Mexico.
 Tony Mendez (1940–2019) – ex-CIA agent, portrayed in 2012 American film Argo.
 Ernest Medina (1936–2018) – Captain of Company C, 1st Battalion, 20th Infantry of the 11th Brigade, Americal Division
 Manuel V. Mendoza (1922–2001) – Medal of Honor (World War II and Korean War)
 Eugene A. Obregon (1930–1950) – Medal of Honor (Korean War)
 Ralph Ambrose O'Neill (1896–1980) – flying ace during WWI
 Mike C. Pena (1924–1950) – Medal of Honor (World War II and Korean War)
 Rafael Peralta (1979–2004) – Navy Cross (Iraq War)
 Oscar F. Perdomo (1919–1976) – United States Air Force flying ace (World War II)
 Manuel Perez Jr. (1923–1945) – Medal of Honor (World War II)
 Leroy Petry (born 1979) – Medal of Honor (War in Afghanistan)
 Lori Piestewa (1973–2003) – first woman in the U.S. armed forces killed in the 2003 Iraq war
 Alfred V. Rascon (born 1945) – Medal of Honor (Vietnam War)
 Eldon Regua (born 1955) – Major General in the US Army reserve
 Louis R. Rocco (1938–2002) – Medal of Honor (Vietnam War)
 Jose Rodela (born 1937) – Medal of Honor (Vietnam War)
 Cleto Rodriguez (1923–1990) – Medal of Honor (World War II)
 Joseph C. Rodriguez (1928–2005) – Medal of Honor (Korean War)
 Alejandro R. Ruiz (1923–2009) – Medal of Honor (World War II)
 Ricardo Sanchez (born 1953) – United States Army General and author (Iraq War)
 Marcelino Serna (1896–1992) – Distinguished Service Cross (World War I)
 France Silva (1876–1951) – Medal of Honor (boxer Rebellion)
 Jose F. Valdez (1925–1945) – Medal of Honor (World War II)
 Eugene A. Valencia Jr. (1921–1972) – flying ace (World War II), Navy Cross
 Alfred Valenzuela (born 1948) – major general, United States Army
 Jay R. Vargas (born 1938) – Medal of Honor (Vietnam)
 Ysmael R. Villegas (1924–1945) – Medal of Honor (World War II)
 Maximo Yabes (1932–1967) – Medal of Honor (Vietnam)
 Sam Ybarra (1945–1982) – United States Army soldier who served in the Tiger Force commando unit attached to the 101st Airborne Division during the Vietnam War. He was of Mexican and Apache descent.

Scholars and educators

 Rodolfo Acuña (born 1932) – historian and professor
 Ricardo Ainslie – psychology professor
 Norma Alarcón (born 1943) – author, professor, and publisher
 Frederick Luis Aldama (born 1969) – university distinguished scholar, writer
 Sofía Espinoza Álvarez (born 1989) – author, researcher, and advocate
 Lena Lovato Archuleta (1920–2011) – educator, librarian, and administrator
 Alfred Arteaga (1950–2008) – writer, poet, and scholar
 Deborah Berebichez – physicist, data scientist, and educator
 Martha E. Bernal (1931–2001) – clinical psychologist
 Elsa Salazar Cade (born 1952) – entomologist/science educator
 Mariano Velazquez de la Cadena (1778–1860) – grammarian, scholar, and author
 Nínive Clements Calegari (born 1971) – educator, founder of national literacy program, 826 National, and The Teacher Salary Project.
 Erika Tatiana Camacho (born 1974) –  mathematical biologist
 Jimena Canales (born 1973) – physicist and engineer, and award-winning historian of science
 Richard Carranza – Chancellor, New York City Public Schools, appointed in March 2018
 David Carrasco (born 1944) – historian of religion, anthropologist, and Mesoamericanist scholar
 Oscar Casares (born 1964) – author and professor
 Joseph I. Castro (born 1966) – Chancellor of the California State University.
 Lauro Cavazos (1927–2022) – U.S. Secretary of Education (1988–1990)
 Gery Chico (born 1956) – Chairman of the Illinois State Board of Education, politician and lawyer
 Francisco G. Cigarroa (born 1957) – chancellor of the University of Texas System and president of the UT Health Science Center in San Antonio, Texas.
 Miguel Angel Corzo (born 1942) – CEO and president of LA Plaza de Cultura y Artes
 Maria Cotera (born 1964) – activist, author, researcher, and professor.
 José Cuéllar – professor of Chicano studies
 Robert R. Davila (born 1932) – president of Gallaudet University
 Jorge Calles-Escandón (born 1951) – physician and researcher
 Roberta Fernández – novelist, scholar, critic, and arts advocate professor
 Rosa-Linda Fregoso – professor of Latin American studies
 Miguel García-Garibay – professor of chemistry and the dean of physical sciences at University of California, Los Angeles.
 Alicia Gaspar de Alba (born 1958) – historian, scholar, author
 Ignacio M. Garcia (born 1950) – professor of Western American history
 Juliet V. García – university president
 Laura E. Gómez (born 1964) – president of the Law and Society Association and a professor of law and American studies at the University of New Mexico
 Guillermo Gómez-Peña (born 1955) – performance artist, author, activist and educator
 Juan Gómez-Quiñones (1940–2020) – professor, historian, poet and activist
 Martin Guevara Urbina (born 1972) – writer, researcher, the professor whose work focuses on Latino issues
 José Ángel Gutiérrez (born 1944) – professor and attorney
 Ralph C. Guzmán (1924–1985) – political scientist, professor, author, Deputy Assistant U.S. Secretary of State, provost Merrill College UC Santa Cruz
 Esteban Rossi-Hansberg (born 1973) – professor of economics at Princeton University
 Arturo Islas (1938–1991) – professor of English and novelist
 Kevin Johnson (academic) – Dean of the UC Davis School of Law
 Alejandro L. Madrid (born 1968) – professor of musicology and ethnomusicology at Cornell University
 Juan L. Maldonado (1948–2018) – higher education administrator
 Elizabeth Martinez (librarian) (born 1943) – professor and Executive Director of the American Library Association
 Ramiro Martinez Jr. (born 1962) – professor of criminology
 Miguel Méndez (legal scholar) (c. 1943 – 2017) – law professor and political figure
 Rachel Moran (born 1956) – Dean of UCLA School of Law
 Jonathon J. Andrew Muñoz – philosopher and educator
 William Nericcio (born 1961) – Chicano literary theorist, American Literature scholar, and professor
 J. Michael Ortiz – president emeritus of Cal Poly Pomona
 Juan J. de Pablo (born 1962) – professor in the Institute for Molecular Engineering at the University of Chicago
 Pamela Anne Quiroz (born 1960) – professor of sociology
 Alberto Ríos (born 1952) – Regents' Professor at Arizona State University, educator and author.
 Vicki L. Ruiz (born 1955) – historian, president of the American Historical Association
 Ramón Saldívar (born 1949) – author, professor, and researcher of cultural studies, National Humanities Medal recipient
 Rita Sanchez (born 1937) – academic in the field of Chicano studies
 Hortensia Soto – mathematics professor at Colorado State University
 Richard A. Tapia (born 1939) – mathematician
 Josefina Villamil Tinajero – president of the National Association for Bilingual Education
 John D. Trasviña (born 1954) – dean of the University of San Francisco School of Law, former Assistant Secretary of the Office of Fair Housing and Equal Opportunity
 Arnulfo Trejo (1922–2002) – writer, college professor, and literary activist
 María Urquides (1908–1994) – K-12 educator, "Mother of Bilingual Education"
 Francisco H. Vázquez (born 1949) – scholar and public intellectual
 María Guillermina Valdes Villalva (1939–1991) – scholar and social activist
 Maria Cristina Villalobos – professor of mathematics
 Erv Wilson (1928–2016) – music theorist
 Leslie Wong (born 1949) – President of San Francisco State University

Science and technology

 Sylvia Acevedo (born 1956/1957) – engineer and businesswoman, worked at NASA's Jet Propulsion Laboratory
 Albert Baez (1912–2007) – physicist and professor, developed the X-ray microscope
 John C. Baez (born 1961) –  mathematical physicist
 Elsa Salazar Cade (born 1952) – science educator and entomologist
 Víctor Celorio (born 1957) – inventor of Instabook or book on demand 
 France A. Córdova (born 1947) – former NASA chief scientist
 Jesús A. De Loera (born 1966) – mathematician at UC Davis
 Teofilo F. Gonzalez (born 1948) – computer scientist and professor
 Sidney M. Gutierrez (born 1951) – former astronaut
 Guadalupe Hayes-Mota – biotechnologist and business director
 José Hernández (born 1962) – former astronaut
 Miguel de Icaza (born 1972) – software programmer
 Lydia Villa-Komaroff (born 1947) – molecular and cellular biologist
 Ynes Mexia (1870–1938) – prominent botanist
 Ricardo Miledi (1927–2017) – neuroscientist and professor at University of California, Irvine
 Héctor García-Molina (1953–2019) – computer scientist and professor in the departments of Computer Science and Electrical Engineering at Stanford University
 Mario J. Molina (1943–2020) – co-discoverer of decomposition of ozone with CFC aerosols, Nobel laureate in Chemistry
 Ellen Ochoa (born 1958) – astronaut, director for flight crew operations for NASA
 John D. Olivas (born 1965) – NASA astronaut
 Jorge López (physicist) (born 1955) – physicist and professor
 Alfredo Quiñones-Hinojosa (born 1968) – associate professor of neurosurgery and oncology; director of the Brain Tumor Stem Cell Laboratory at Johns Hopkins University and brain surgeon at Johns Hopkins Hospital
 Paulo Lozano – aerospace engineer at MIT and pioneer in the field of micro-propulsion
 Eloy Rodriguez (born 1947) – biochemist, professor at Cornell University
 Sarah Stewart (1905–1976) – pioneered the field of viral oncology research
 Tedy Taylor (1925–2004) – theoretical physicist and nuclear weapon designer
 Ignacio Tinoco Jr. (1930–2016) – chemist and professor
 Jorge Gardea-Torresdey – chemist and academic
 Nora Volkow (born 1956) – scientist, physician, psychiatrist, great-granddaughter of Leon Trotsky and director of the National Institute on Drug Abuse (NIDA), part of the National Institutes of Health (NIH)

Civil rights leaders and community activists

 Lucy G. Acosta (1926–2008) – civil rights activist
 Gaylon Alcaraz (born 1970) – community organizer, human rights activist
 Lupe Anguiano (born 1929) – civil rights activist
 Lorena Borjas (1960–2020) – Mexican-born American transgender and immigrant rights activist, known as the mother of the transgender Latinx community in Queens, New York
 Norma V. Cantu (born 1954) – civil rights lawyer and college professor
 Carlos Cadena (1917–2001) – attorney in the landmark Hernandez v. Texas supreme court case
 Adelfa Botello Callejo (1923–2014) – civil rights lawyer
 José Tomás Canales (1877–1976) – civil rights activist and politician active during the early 1900s, played key role in the foundation of the League of United Latin American Citizens.
 Aurora Castillo (1914–1998) – environmental activist
 Sal Castro (1933–2013) – civil rights activist and educator
 Ernesto Chacon (born 1938) – Latino and low income civil rights activist

 César Chávez (1927–1993) – labor leader and activist
 Linda Chavez-Thompson (born 1944) – former executive vice-president of the AFL–CIO
 Miguel Contreras (1952–2005) – labor leader
 Jeanne Córdova (1948–2016) – lesbian and gay rights activist, writer
 Bert Corona (1918–2001) – labor and community organizer
 Ricardo Cruz (1943–1993) – attorney, civil rights activist
 Jessie Lopez De La Cruz (1919–2013) – labor organizer
 Maria Echaveste (born 1954) – former White House Deputy Chief of Staff and Senior Fellow at the Center for American Progress
 Josefina Fierro de Bright (1914–1998) – civil rights activist during The Great Depression
Nick Fuentes – white nationalist, far-right political commentator and podcaster. Paternal grandfather was Mexican
 Ernesto Galarza (1905–1984) – labor activist, professor, and writer
 Gustavo C. Garcia (1915–1964) – attorney in the landmark Hernandez v. Texas supreme court case
 Hector P. Garcia (1914–1996) – physician, veteran, and civil rights advocate
 Eva Carrillo de García (1883–1979) – missionary, nurse, and civil-rights activist
 Oscar Gomez (activist) (died 1994) student activist
 Erika Guevara Rosas – human rights lawyer, Americas director at Amnesty International
 Anna Nieto-Gómez (born 1946) – activist and journalist
 Rodolfo Gonzales (1928–2005) – leader of the Chicano civil rights movement, boxer, poet
 José Ángel Gutiérrez (born 1944) – political activist, founder of the Raza Unida party, writer, and professor
 John J. Herrera (1910–1986) – civil rights leader
 Dolores Huerta (born 1930) – civil rights leader
 Jovita Idar (1885–1946) – journalist, political activist and civil rights worker
 Ralph Lazo (1924–1992) – advocated on behalf of Japanese American internment victims.
 Nativo Lopez (1951–2019) – civil rights activist
 Raul Loya – civil rights activist
 Mimi Lozano (born 1933) – co-founded the Society of Hispanic Historical and Ancestral Research
 Angel G. Luévano (born 1949) – labor leader and activist
 Rueben Martinez (born 1940) – activist and businessman
 Vilma Socorro Martínez (born 1943) – civil rights activist, lawyer and diplomat
 Eliseo Medina (born 1946) – labor activist
 Enrique Morones – immigrant human rights activist
 Janet Murguía (born 1960) – civil rights activist
 Ernesto Nieto (born 1940) – founder of the National Hispanic Institute
 Alex Pacheco (born 1958) – activist
 Emiliano Reyes (born 1984) – business executive and humanitarian activist. He is of Mexican and Swedish descent.
 Julian Samora (1920–1996) – community activist, teacher, and scholar
 Leila Steinberg (born 1961) – educator dedicated to helping at-risk youth find their voice using an emotional literacy curriculum, best known as mentor of rapper Tupac Shakur.
 Olga Talamante (born 1950) – political activist
 Emma Tenayuca (1916–1999) – labor organizer
 Reies López Tijerina (1926–2015) – activist, founder of the Alianza Federal de Mercedes
 John Trudell (1946–2015) – musician, author, poet, and political activist
 Cristina Tzintzún (born 1982) – organizer, author, and co-founder of the Workers Defense Project
 Baldemar Velasquez (born 1947) – president of the Farm Labor Organizing Committee
 Gustavo Velasquez (born 1972) – Secretary of the Office of Fair Housing and Equal Opportunity
 Delia Villegas Vorhauer (1940–1992) – activist, social worker, and writer
 Vicente T. Ximenes (1919–2014) – civil rights activist, commissioner of EEOC, and chairman of first Presidential Cabinet on Mexican American Affairs
 Raul Yzaguirre (born 1939) – civil rights activist

Religious figures

 Eusebio L. Elizondo Almaguer (born 1954) – Bishop of the Roman Catholic Archdiocese of Seattle
 Oscar Cantú (born 1966) – Auxiliary Bishop in San Antonio, Texas.
 Minerva G. Carcaño (born 1954) – Bishop in the United Methodist Church
 Arturo Cepeda (born 1969) – Auxiliary Bishop of the Archdiocese of Detroit
 Gilbert Espinosa Chávez (1932–2020) – Roman Catholic bishop
 Virgilio Elizondo (1935–2016) – Roman Catholic priest, and theologian
 Cirilo Flores (1948–2014) – 5th Bishop of San Diego
 Daniel E. Flores (born 1961) – Bishop of Brownsville
 Patrick Flores (1929–2017) – Roman Catholic bishop
 Elias Gabriel Galvan (born 1938) – retired Bishop of the United Methodist Church
 Naason Joaquin Garcia (born 1969) – current international leader of the La Luz Del Mundo church, and former pastor of several La Luz Del Mundo churches in California and Arizona between 1994 and 2014
 Richard John Garcia (1947–2018) – bishop of Monterey, California
 Gustavo García-Siller (born 1950) – Archbishop of the Archdiocese of San Antonio
 José Horacio Gómez (born 1951) – Archbishop of Los Angeles 
 René Henry Gracida (born 1923) – bishop
 Joel Nestali Martinez (born 1940) – Bishop in the United Methodist Church
 Peter Morales – president of the Unitarian Universalist Association
 Eduardo Nevares (born 1954) – Auxiliary Bishop of the Diocese of Phoenix
 Jorge Rodríguez-Novelo (born 1955) – Auxiliary Bishop for the Archdiocese of Denver
 Armando Xavier Ochoa (born 1943) – Bishop of El Paso, TX
 Ricardo Ramírez (born 1936) – Bishop of Las Cruzes, New Mexico.
 Plácido Rodriguez (born 1940) – Bishop of Lubbock, Texas
 Alberto Rojas (born 1965) – Auxiliary Bishop and Episcopal Vicar for the Archdiocese of Chicago.
 Jaime Soto (born 1955) – Roman Catholic coadjutor bishop of Sacramento
 James Anthony Tamayo (born 1949) – Bishop of Laredo, Texas
 Ricardo Watty Urquidi (1938–2011) – Bishop of the Diocese of Tepic in Nayarit, Mexico
 Joe S. Vásquez (born 1957) – Bishop of the Roman Catholic diocese of Austin, Texas.
 Gabino Zavala (born 1951) – Auxiliary Bishop of the Archdiocese of Los Angeles

Businesspeople and entrepreneurs

 

 Manuel Abud – media, television, and cable executive
 Linda G. Alvarado (born 1951) – president and chief executive officer of a large commercial and industrial general contracting firm, co-owner of the Colorado Rockies baseball team.
 María Elena Avila (born 1953) – entrepreneur, philanthropist, and civic leader in California
 Michael Ball – fashion mogul
 Hector Barreto Jr. (born 1961) – 21st Administrator of the US Small Business Administration
 Emilio Diez Barroso – chairman and CEO of NALA Investments, a private investment holding company
 Xochi Birch – computer programmer and entrepreneur 
 Adolfo Camarillo (1864–1958) – businessman, wealthy landowner, and philanthropist
 Juan Camarillo Jr. (1867–1936) – businessman, wealthy landowner, and philanthropist
 Jovita Carranza (born 1949) – President & CEO of the JCR Group, a consulting firm; former Deputy Administrator for the United States Small Business Administration
 Rudy Chapa (born 1957) – track runner and businessman
 Anna Maria Chávez (born 1968) – CEO of the Girl Scouts of the USA
 Chicano Roy (Roy Suarez Garcia) (1945–2003) – motorbike builder and inventor
 Maria Contreras-Sweet (born 1955) – 24th Administrator of the Small Business Administration, former executive chairwoman and founder of ProAmérica Bank.
 Mike Curb (born 1944) – record company executive, NASCAR car owner, and former Lieutenant Governor of California.
 William Davila (1931–2014) – first Mexican-American president of a large supermarket chain
 Gérard Louis-Dreyfus (1932–2016) – chairman of Louis Dreyfus Energy Services
 Juan Enríquez (born 1959) – Managing Director of Excel Venture Management, academic, and speaker
 Tavo Hellmund (born 1966) – former racing driver and promoter
 Enrique Hernandez Jr. (born 1955) – business executive, president, and chief executive officer of Inter-Con Security Systems, Inc., and a director of Wells Fargo and McDonald's
 Traci Des Jardins (born 1967) – restaurateur and award-winning chef
 Ninfa Laurenzo (1924–2001) – restaurateur
 Bismarck Lepe – information technology CEO and product manager
 Ignacio E. Lozano Sr. (1886–1953) – founder of La Opinión, the largest Spanish language newspaper in the US
 Ignacio E. Lozano Jr. (born 1927) – newspaper publisher, ambassador, and corporate director
 José I. Lozano (born 1954) – executive vice-president of Impremedia LLC
 Daniel Lubetzky (born 1968) – entrepreneur, author, and activist, best known as the Founder and CEO of KIND LLC.
 David Martinez (born 1957) – managing partner
 Mariano Martinez (entrepreneur) (born 1944) – inventor, entrepreneur, and restaurateur
 Emilio Azcárraga Milmo (1930–1997) – CEO, media mogul
 Richard Montañez – best known for claiming to have invented Flamin' Hot Cheetos
 Kate and Laura Mulleavy (born 1979, born 1980) – fashion designers
 Oscar Munoz (executive) (born 1960) – CEO of United Airlines
 Hugo Morales (radio) – radio executive
 Arturo Moreno (born 1946) – businessman and owner of the Los Angeles Angels
 George Paz – CEO of Express Scripts, the largest pharmacy benefit management organization in the US.
 Dan Peña (born 1945) – financial analyst on Wall Street
 Lisa Garcia Quiroz (1961–2018) – media executive, launched People en Español
 Emiliano Reyes (born 1984) – American business executive, humanitarian activist, and Wikipedia author
 Emilio Romano – managing director of Bank of America Merrill Lynch Mexico
 John Romero (born 1967) – video game developer, co-founder of id Software
 Rosa Rios (born 1965) – 43rd and current treasurer of the United States, businesswoman, executive, and entrepreneur.
 Louis Ruiz (born 1953) – creator of Ruiz Foods, Inc. (Largest Latino owned company in California) 
 Leslie Sanchez (born 1971) – founder and CEO of Impacto Group LLC, a Washington, D.C.-based market research and consulting firm
 Tony Sanchez (born 1943) – businessman, philanthropist, and Democratic politician
 Felix Tijerina (1905–1965) – restaurateur, activist, and philanthropist
 Solomon Trujillo (born 1951) – CEO and businessman
 Louis Verdad – fashion designer
 Sam Zamarripa (born 1952) – entrepreneur, author, and public official
 Sergio Zyman (born 1945) – marketing executive

Historical figures
 Gregorio Cortez (1875–1916) – Mexican-American outlaw and folk hero
 Joaquin Murrieta (1829–1853) – Mexican-American bandit or Robin Hood during the California Gold Rush of the 1850s.

Food

 Gustavo Brambila (born 1953) – winemaker in the Napa Valley
 Pati Jinich (born 1972) – Emmy nominated chef, TV personality, cookbook author
 Aarón Sanchez (born 1976) – chef and television personality
 Marcela Valladolid (born 1978) – chef and television host
 Traci Des Jardins American chef and restaurateur
 Claudette Zepeda award-winning, San Diego-based chef and culinary entrepreneur won the "Battle Chocolate" in Iron Chef: Quest for an Iron Legend

Other

 Andre “Big A” – mechanic known for changing his last name to a blank character to protest the Vietnam War
 Blaire White (born 1993) – YouTuber, political commentator, Internet personality
 Jimmy Santiago Baca (born 1952) – American poet and writer of Apache and Chicano descent
 Johnny Canales (born 1947) – talk show host
 Gregorio Cortez (1875–1916) – Mexican-born and a folk hero to the border communities of the United States and Mexico.
 GypsyCrusader (born 1988) – far-right political commentator, streamer, white supremacist, former Muay Thai fighter, and convicted felon
 Mark Hugo Lopez (born 1967) – Director of Hispanic Research at the Pew Research Center
 Oscar Ozzy Lusth (born 1981) – 1st runner-up on Survivor; Cook Islands
 Jair Marrufo (born 1977) – professional soccer referee
 Edmund McMillen (born 1980) – video game designer and artist
 Raul Melgoza (1975–2020) – fashion designer
 Cesar Millan (born 1969) – TV personality, dog trainer, and author
 Carmen Osbahr (born 1962) – puppeteers Rosita in the children's series Sesame Street
 Albert Pissis (1852–1914) – architect who introduced the Beaux-Arts architectural style to San Francisco
 Dionicio Rodriguez (1891–1955) – architect
 John Romero (born 1967) – American director, designer, programmer, and developer in the video game industry. He is co-founder of id Software
 Baldomero Toledo (born 1970) – professional soccer referee
 Luis Velador (born 1964) – two-time World Series of Poker bracelet winner
 Eric Volz (born 1979) – entrepreneur, author, and managing director of an international crisis resource agency
 Eduardo Xol (born 1966) – most known for his work as a designer on Extreme Makeover: Home Edition

See also

 Notable Hispanics
 Chicano
 List of Mexicans
 List of Mexican British people

References

Lists of American people by ethnic or national origin
Chicano
List of Mexican Americans
Americans
Lists of American people of Latin American descent
Lists of people by ethnicity